

403001–403100 

|-bgcolor=#fefefe
| 403001 ||  || — || November 2, 2007 || Kitt Peak || Spacewatch || NYS || align=right data-sort-value="0.85" | 850 m || 
|-id=002 bgcolor=#fefefe
| 403002 ||  || — || November 15, 2007 || Socorro || LINEAR || — || align=right data-sort-value="0.91" | 910 m || 
|-id=003 bgcolor=#E9E9E9
| 403003 ||  || — || November 15, 2007 || Socorro || LINEAR || — || align=right | 1.1 km || 
|-id=004 bgcolor=#fefefe
| 403004 ||  || — || November 14, 2007 || Kitt Peak || Spacewatch || — || align=right data-sort-value="0.78" | 780 m || 
|-id=005 bgcolor=#fefefe
| 403005 ||  || — || November 14, 2007 || Kitt Peak || Spacewatch || NYS || align=right data-sort-value="0.81" | 810 m || 
|-id=006 bgcolor=#fefefe
| 403006 ||  || — || November 12, 2007 || Mount Lemmon || Mount Lemmon Survey || — || align=right data-sort-value="0.94" | 940 m || 
|-id=007 bgcolor=#fefefe
| 403007 ||  || — || October 2, 2003 || Kitt Peak || Spacewatch || — || align=right data-sort-value="0.87" | 870 m || 
|-id=008 bgcolor=#E9E9E9
| 403008 ||  || — || November 2, 2007 || Catalina || CSS || JUN || align=right | 1.2 km || 
|-id=009 bgcolor=#E9E9E9
| 403009 ||  || — || November 1, 2007 || Kitt Peak || Spacewatch || — || align=right | 1.1 km || 
|-id=010 bgcolor=#fefefe
| 403010 ||  || — || November 2, 2007 || Kitt Peak || Spacewatch || — || align=right data-sort-value="0.83" | 830 m || 
|-id=011 bgcolor=#d6d6d6
| 403011 ||  || — || November 8, 2007 || Kitt Peak || Spacewatch || 3:2 || align=right | 4.5 km || 
|-id=012 bgcolor=#E9E9E9
| 403012 ||  || — || November 7, 2007 || Kitt Peak || Spacewatch || — || align=right | 1.8 km || 
|-id=013 bgcolor=#fefefe
| 403013 ||  || — || November 9, 2007 || Socorro || LINEAR || V || align=right data-sort-value="0.65" | 650 m || 
|-id=014 bgcolor=#E9E9E9
| 403014 ||  || — || November 9, 2007 || Mount Lemmon || Mount Lemmon Survey || — || align=right | 1.0 km || 
|-id=015 bgcolor=#fefefe
| 403015 ||  || — || November 17, 2007 || Socorro || LINEAR || — || align=right | 1.0 km || 
|-id=016 bgcolor=#fefefe
| 403016 ||  || — || November 2, 2007 || Socorro || LINEAR || — || align=right data-sort-value="0.78" | 780 m || 
|-id=017 bgcolor=#fefefe
| 403017 ||  || — || November 18, 2007 || Mount Lemmon || Mount Lemmon Survey || — || align=right data-sort-value="0.82" | 820 m || 
|-id=018 bgcolor=#E9E9E9
| 403018 ||  || — || November 3, 2007 || Kitt Peak || Spacewatch || (5) || align=right data-sort-value="0.87" | 870 m || 
|-id=019 bgcolor=#fefefe
| 403019 ||  || — || September 15, 2007 || Mount Lemmon || Mount Lemmon Survey || NYS || align=right data-sort-value="0.83" | 830 m || 
|-id=020 bgcolor=#E9E9E9
| 403020 ||  || — || November 17, 2007 || Socorro || LINEAR || — || align=right | 1.4 km || 
|-id=021 bgcolor=#E9E9E9
| 403021 ||  || — || November 19, 2007 || Mount Lemmon || Mount Lemmon Survey || — || align=right | 1.3 km || 
|-id=022 bgcolor=#fefefe
| 403022 ||  || — || November 4, 2007 || Socorro || LINEAR || — || align=right data-sort-value="0.95" | 950 m || 
|-id=023 bgcolor=#fefefe
| 403023 ||  || — || December 4, 2007 || Catalina || CSS || — || align=right data-sort-value="0.97" | 970 m || 
|-id=024 bgcolor=#fefefe
| 403024 ||  || — || December 11, 2007 || La Sagra || OAM Obs. || — || align=right | 1.8 km || 
|-id=025 bgcolor=#E9E9E9
| 403025 ||  || — || December 13, 2007 || Dauban || Chante-Perdrix Obs. || — || align=right | 3.9 km || 
|-id=026 bgcolor=#fefefe
| 403026 ||  || — || December 4, 2007 || Catalina || CSS || — || align=right | 1.1 km || 
|-id=027 bgcolor=#fefefe
| 403027 ||  || — || December 15, 2007 || Kitt Peak || Spacewatch || NYS || align=right data-sort-value="0.78" | 780 m || 
|-id=028 bgcolor=#E9E9E9
| 403028 ||  || — || November 5, 2007 || Mount Lemmon || Mount Lemmon Survey || — || align=right | 1.0 km || 
|-id=029 bgcolor=#fefefe
| 403029 ||  || — || December 6, 2007 || Kitt Peak || Spacewatch || — || align=right | 1.0 km || 
|-id=030 bgcolor=#fefefe
| 403030 ||  || — || December 4, 2007 || Kitt Peak || Spacewatch || NYS || align=right data-sort-value="0.62" | 620 m || 
|-id=031 bgcolor=#E9E9E9
| 403031 ||  || — || December 5, 2007 || Kitt Peak || Spacewatch || — || align=right | 2.6 km || 
|-id=032 bgcolor=#d6d6d6
| 403032 ||  || — || December 15, 2007 || Kitt Peak || Spacewatch || — || align=right | 2.3 km || 
|-id=033 bgcolor=#E9E9E9
| 403033 ||  || — || December 30, 2007 || Mount Lemmon || Mount Lemmon Survey || — || align=right data-sort-value="0.93" | 930 m || 
|-id=034 bgcolor=#E9E9E9
| 403034 ||  || — || November 8, 2007 || Mount Lemmon || Mount Lemmon Survey || — || align=right | 3.0 km || 
|-id=035 bgcolor=#fefefe
| 403035 ||  || — || December 4, 2007 || Socorro || LINEAR || H || align=right data-sort-value="0.83" | 830 m || 
|-id=036 bgcolor=#E9E9E9
| 403036 ||  || — || December 30, 2007 || Kitt Peak || Spacewatch || (5) || align=right data-sort-value="0.77" | 770 m || 
|-id=037 bgcolor=#E9E9E9
| 403037 ||  || — || December 19, 2007 || Mount Lemmon || Mount Lemmon Survey || RAF || align=right data-sort-value="0.93" | 930 m || 
|-id=038 bgcolor=#E9E9E9
| 403038 ||  || — || December 31, 2007 || Kitt Peak || Spacewatch || — || align=right | 1.5 km || 
|-id=039 bgcolor=#FFC2E0
| 403039 ||  || — || January 1, 2008 || Catalina || CSS || AMO || align=right data-sort-value="0.38" | 380 m || 
|-id=040 bgcolor=#E9E9E9
| 403040 ||  || — || December 30, 2007 || Mount Lemmon || Mount Lemmon Survey || (5) || align=right data-sort-value="0.85" | 850 m || 
|-id=041 bgcolor=#E9E9E9
| 403041 ||  || — || January 7, 2008 || Lulin || LUSS || (5) || align=right | 1.0 km || 
|-id=042 bgcolor=#d6d6d6
| 403042 ||  || — || January 10, 2008 || Mount Lemmon || Mount Lemmon Survey || — || align=right | 2.6 km || 
|-id=043 bgcolor=#fefefe
| 403043 ||  || — || January 10, 2008 || Mount Lemmon || Mount Lemmon Survey || NYS || align=right data-sort-value="0.75" | 750 m || 
|-id=044 bgcolor=#E9E9E9
| 403044 ||  || — || January 10, 2008 || Catalina || CSS || (10369) || align=right | 3.1 km || 
|-id=045 bgcolor=#E9E9E9
| 403045 ||  || — || January 1, 2008 || 7300 Observatory || W. K. Y. Yeung || EUN || align=right | 1.2 km || 
|-id=046 bgcolor=#E9E9E9
| 403046 ||  || — || December 30, 2007 || Kitt Peak || Spacewatch || DOR || align=right | 2.2 km || 
|-id=047 bgcolor=#E9E9E9
| 403047 ||  || — || January 14, 2008 || Piszkéstető || K. Sárneczky || — || align=right | 1.9 km || 
|-id=048 bgcolor=#fefefe
| 403048 ||  || — || January 10, 2008 || Kitt Peak || Spacewatch || — || align=right data-sort-value="0.71" | 710 m || 
|-id=049 bgcolor=#FA8072
| 403049 ||  || — || January 10, 2008 || Catalina || CSS || — || align=right data-sort-value="0.85" | 850 m || 
|-id=050 bgcolor=#E9E9E9
| 403050 ||  || — || January 11, 2008 || Kitt Peak || Spacewatch || — || align=right | 1.5 km || 
|-id=051 bgcolor=#E9E9E9
| 403051 ||  || — || November 19, 2007 || Mount Lemmon || Mount Lemmon Survey || (5) || align=right data-sort-value="0.89" | 890 m || 
|-id=052 bgcolor=#E9E9E9
| 403052 ||  || — || January 12, 2008 || Kitt Peak || Spacewatch || — || align=right | 1.9 km || 
|-id=053 bgcolor=#E9E9E9
| 403053 ||  || — || January 12, 2008 || Kitt Peak || Spacewatch || — || align=right data-sort-value="0.75" | 750 m || 
|-id=054 bgcolor=#E9E9E9
| 403054 ||  || — || November 13, 2007 || Mount Lemmon || Mount Lemmon Survey || ADE || align=right | 2.1 km || 
|-id=055 bgcolor=#E9E9E9
| 403055 ||  || — || January 12, 2008 || La Sagra || OAM Obs. || — || align=right | 1.5 km || 
|-id=056 bgcolor=#E9E9E9
| 403056 ||  || — || January 14, 2008 || Kitt Peak || Spacewatch || — || align=right | 2.4 km || 
|-id=057 bgcolor=#fefefe
| 403057 ||  || — || December 30, 2007 || Kitt Peak || Spacewatch || — || align=right data-sort-value="0.87" | 870 m || 
|-id=058 bgcolor=#E9E9E9
| 403058 ||  || — || January 11, 2008 || Kitt Peak || Spacewatch || — || align=right | 1.4 km || 
|-id=059 bgcolor=#E9E9E9
| 403059 ||  || — || January 10, 2008 || Mount Lemmon || Mount Lemmon Survey || (5) || align=right data-sort-value="0.77" | 770 m || 
|-id=060 bgcolor=#E9E9E9
| 403060 ||  || — || July 22, 2006 || Mount Lemmon || Mount Lemmon Survey || — || align=right data-sort-value="0.94" | 940 m || 
|-id=061 bgcolor=#E9E9E9
| 403061 ||  || — || December 30, 2007 || Kitt Peak || Spacewatch || — || align=right data-sort-value="0.89" | 890 m || 
|-id=062 bgcolor=#E9E9E9
| 403062 ||  || — || January 30, 2008 || Kitt Peak || Spacewatch || — || align=right | 2.6 km || 
|-id=063 bgcolor=#E9E9E9
| 403063 ||  || — || January 30, 2008 || Kitt Peak || Spacewatch || — || align=right | 2.1 km || 
|-id=064 bgcolor=#E9E9E9
| 403064 ||  || — || January 30, 2008 || Kitt Peak || Spacewatch || — || align=right | 2.0 km || 
|-id=065 bgcolor=#E9E9E9
| 403065 ||  || — || January 30, 2008 || Kitt Peak || Spacewatch || — || align=right | 1.3 km || 
|-id=066 bgcolor=#fefefe
| 403066 ||  || — || December 18, 2007 || Mount Lemmon || Mount Lemmon Survey || H || align=right data-sort-value="0.84" | 840 m || 
|-id=067 bgcolor=#E9E9E9
| 403067 ||  || — || October 20, 2007 || Kitt Peak || Spacewatch || — || align=right | 2.2 km || 
|-id=068 bgcolor=#E9E9E9
| 403068 ||  || — || January 31, 2008 || Catalina || CSS || — || align=right | 1.9 km || 
|-id=069 bgcolor=#E9E9E9
| 403069 ||  || — || December 31, 2007 || Mount Lemmon || Mount Lemmon Survey || — || align=right | 2.5 km || 
|-id=070 bgcolor=#E9E9E9
| 403070 ||  || — || January 31, 2008 || Lulin Observatory || LUSS || HNS || align=right | 1.3 km || 
|-id=071 bgcolor=#E9E9E9
| 403071 ||  || — || January 30, 2008 || Kitt Peak || Spacewatch || — || align=right | 1.8 km || 
|-id=072 bgcolor=#E9E9E9
| 403072 ||  || — || January 18, 2008 || Mount Lemmon || Mount Lemmon Survey || — || align=right | 1.7 km || 
|-id=073 bgcolor=#E9E9E9
| 403073 ||  || — || January 30, 2008 || Mount Lemmon || Mount Lemmon Survey || — || align=right | 1.5 km || 
|-id=074 bgcolor=#E9E9E9
| 403074 ||  || — || February 1, 2008 || Mount Lemmon || Mount Lemmon Survey || — || align=right | 2.2 km || 
|-id=075 bgcolor=#E9E9E9
| 403075 ||  || — || February 1, 2008 || Mount Lemmon || Mount Lemmon Survey || GAL || align=right | 1.7 km || 
|-id=076 bgcolor=#fefefe
| 403076 ||  || — || February 3, 2008 || Kitt Peak || Spacewatch || H || align=right data-sort-value="0.57" | 570 m || 
|-id=077 bgcolor=#E9E9E9
| 403077 ||  || — || November 20, 2007 || Mount Lemmon || Mount Lemmon Survey || — || align=right | 1.2 km || 
|-id=078 bgcolor=#E9E9E9
| 403078 ||  || — || February 3, 2008 || Kitt Peak || Spacewatch || — || align=right | 2.7 km || 
|-id=079 bgcolor=#fefefe
| 403079 ||  || — || February 3, 2008 || Catalina || CSS || H || align=right data-sort-value="0.83" | 830 m || 
|-id=080 bgcolor=#E9E9E9
| 403080 ||  || — || November 9, 2007 || Mount Lemmon || Mount Lemmon Survey || — || align=right | 2.1 km || 
|-id=081 bgcolor=#E9E9E9
| 403081 ||  || — || February 6, 2008 || Catalina || CSS || — || align=right | 2.4 km || 
|-id=082 bgcolor=#E9E9E9
| 403082 ||  || — || October 19, 2007 || Mount Lemmon || Mount Lemmon Survey || — || align=right | 1.3 km || 
|-id=083 bgcolor=#E9E9E9
| 403083 ||  || — || September 14, 2006 || Kitt Peak || Spacewatch || — || align=right | 1.8 km || 
|-id=084 bgcolor=#E9E9E9
| 403084 ||  || — || February 2, 2008 || Kitt Peak || Spacewatch || — || align=right | 1.6 km || 
|-id=085 bgcolor=#E9E9E9
| 403085 ||  || — || February 2, 2008 || Kitt Peak || Spacewatch || — || align=right | 2.0 km || 
|-id=086 bgcolor=#E9E9E9
| 403086 ||  || — || January 11, 2008 || Mount Lemmon || Mount Lemmon Survey || — || align=right | 2.6 km || 
|-id=087 bgcolor=#E9E9E9
| 403087 ||  || — || February 2, 2008 || Kitt Peak || Spacewatch || — || align=right | 2.1 km || 
|-id=088 bgcolor=#d6d6d6
| 403088 ||  || — || February 2, 2008 || Kitt Peak || Spacewatch || — || align=right | 2.6 km || 
|-id=089 bgcolor=#E9E9E9
| 403089 ||  || — || February 7, 2008 || Mount Lemmon || Mount Lemmon Survey || — || align=right | 2.4 km || 
|-id=090 bgcolor=#E9E9E9
| 403090 ||  || — || February 8, 2008 || Mount Lemmon || Mount Lemmon Survey || AGN || align=right | 1.3 km || 
|-id=091 bgcolor=#E9E9E9
| 403091 ||  || — || February 7, 2008 || Catalina || CSS || HNS || align=right | 1.1 km || 
|-id=092 bgcolor=#FA8072
| 403092 ||  || — || February 10, 2008 || Socorro || LINEAR || H || align=right data-sort-value="0.86" | 860 m || 
|-id=093 bgcolor=#E9E9E9
| 403093 ||  || — || October 23, 2006 || Palomar || NEAT || HNS || align=right | 1.4 km || 
|-id=094 bgcolor=#E9E9E9
| 403094 ||  || — || February 7, 2008 || Mount Lemmon || Mount Lemmon Survey || — || align=right | 1.5 km || 
|-id=095 bgcolor=#E9E9E9
| 403095 ||  || — || November 14, 2007 || Mount Lemmon || Mount Lemmon Survey || — || align=right | 1.8 km || 
|-id=096 bgcolor=#E9E9E9
| 403096 ||  || — || February 2, 2008 || Kitt Peak || Spacewatch || — || align=right | 1.4 km || 
|-id=097 bgcolor=#E9E9E9
| 403097 ||  || — || February 11, 2008 || Dauban || F. Kugel || — || align=right | 2.3 km || 
|-id=098 bgcolor=#E9E9E9
| 403098 ||  || — || February 7, 2008 || Mount Lemmon || Mount Lemmon Survey || — || align=right | 1.2 km || 
|-id=099 bgcolor=#E9E9E9
| 403099 ||  || — || February 8, 2008 || Kitt Peak || Spacewatch || — || align=right | 1.9 km || 
|-id=100 bgcolor=#d6d6d6
| 403100 ||  || — || February 8, 2008 || Kitt Peak || Spacewatch || — || align=right | 2.1 km || 
|}

403101–403200 

|-bgcolor=#E9E9E9
| 403101 ||  || — || February 1, 2008 || Kitt Peak || Spacewatch || DOR || align=right | 2.5 km || 
|-id=102 bgcolor=#fefefe
| 403102 ||  || — || January 15, 2008 || Mount Lemmon || Mount Lemmon Survey || — || align=right data-sort-value="0.83" | 830 m || 
|-id=103 bgcolor=#E9E9E9
| 403103 ||  || — || February 9, 2008 || Kitt Peak || Spacewatch || — || align=right data-sort-value="0.95" | 950 m || 
|-id=104 bgcolor=#E9E9E9
| 403104 ||  || — || February 9, 2008 || Kitt Peak || Spacewatch || HNS || align=right | 1.3 km || 
|-id=105 bgcolor=#E9E9E9
| 403105 ||  || — || February 9, 2008 || Kitt Peak || Spacewatch || — || align=right | 2.3 km || 
|-id=106 bgcolor=#E9E9E9
| 403106 ||  || — || February 9, 2008 || Kitt Peak || Spacewatch || (5) || align=right data-sort-value="0.77" | 770 m || 
|-id=107 bgcolor=#E9E9E9
| 403107 ||  || — || February 9, 2008 || Kitt Peak || Spacewatch || — || align=right data-sort-value="0.92" | 920 m || 
|-id=108 bgcolor=#E9E9E9
| 403108 ||  || — || February 9, 2008 || Kitt Peak || Spacewatch || — || align=right | 2.0 km || 
|-id=109 bgcolor=#E9E9E9
| 403109 ||  || — || February 10, 2008 || Anderson Mesa || LONEOS || — || align=right | 1.4 km || 
|-id=110 bgcolor=#E9E9E9
| 403110 ||  || — || January 12, 2008 || Socorro || LINEAR || — || align=right | 1.7 km || 
|-id=111 bgcolor=#d6d6d6
| 403111 ||  || — || November 20, 2007 || Mount Lemmon || Mount Lemmon Survey || — || align=right | 3.0 km || 
|-id=112 bgcolor=#E9E9E9
| 403112 ||  || — || January 10, 2008 || Catalina || CSS || — || align=right | 1.5 km || 
|-id=113 bgcolor=#E9E9E9
| 403113 ||  || — || February 13, 2008 || Mount Lemmon || Mount Lemmon Survey || — || align=right | 2.5 km || 
|-id=114 bgcolor=#E9E9E9
| 403114 ||  || — || February 8, 2008 || Mount Lemmon || Mount Lemmon Survey || — || align=right | 2.4 km || 
|-id=115 bgcolor=#E9E9E9
| 403115 ||  || — || February 3, 2008 || Catalina || CSS || — || align=right | 1.3 km || 
|-id=116 bgcolor=#E9E9E9
| 403116 ||  || — || January 18, 2008 || Kitt Peak || Spacewatch || — || align=right | 2.4 km || 
|-id=117 bgcolor=#E9E9E9
| 403117 ||  || — || February 24, 2008 || Mount Lemmon || Mount Lemmon Survey || — || align=right | 1.6 km || 
|-id=118 bgcolor=#E9E9E9
| 403118 ||  || — || January 10, 2008 || Mount Lemmon || Mount Lemmon Survey || — || align=right data-sort-value="0.97" | 970 m || 
|-id=119 bgcolor=#E9E9E9
| 403119 ||  || — || February 26, 2008 || Mount Lemmon || Mount Lemmon Survey || — || align=right | 3.3 km || 
|-id=120 bgcolor=#E9E9E9
| 403120 ||  || — || February 27, 2008 || Catalina || CSS || — || align=right | 1.9 km || 
|-id=121 bgcolor=#E9E9E9
| 403121 ||  || — || December 15, 2007 || Catalina || CSS || — || align=right | 2.1 km || 
|-id=122 bgcolor=#E9E9E9
| 403122 ||  || — || February 27, 2008 || Kitt Peak || Spacewatch || — || align=right | 1.9 km || 
|-id=123 bgcolor=#E9E9E9
| 403123 ||  || — || February 10, 2008 || Mount Lemmon || Mount Lemmon Survey || — || align=right | 1.6 km || 
|-id=124 bgcolor=#E9E9E9
| 403124 ||  || — || February 29, 2008 || Catalina || CSS || — || align=right | 2.6 km || 
|-id=125 bgcolor=#E9E9E9
| 403125 ||  || — || February 10, 2008 || Kitt Peak || Spacewatch || WIT || align=right data-sort-value="0.81" | 810 m || 
|-id=126 bgcolor=#E9E9E9
| 403126 ||  || — || February 28, 2008 || Mount Lemmon || Mount Lemmon Survey || — || align=right | 2.1 km || 
|-id=127 bgcolor=#E9E9E9
| 403127 ||  || — || February 28, 2008 || Mount Lemmon || Mount Lemmon Survey || — || align=right | 2.6 km || 
|-id=128 bgcolor=#d6d6d6
| 403128 ||  || — || February 27, 2008 || Mount Lemmon || Mount Lemmon Survey || — || align=right | 2.1 km || 
|-id=129 bgcolor=#fefefe
| 403129 ||  || — || March 8, 2008 || Catalina || CSS || H || align=right data-sort-value="0.62" | 620 m || 
|-id=130 bgcolor=#FA8072
| 403130 ||  || — || March 9, 2008 || Socorro || LINEAR || H || align=right data-sort-value="0.78" | 780 m || 
|-id=131 bgcolor=#d6d6d6
| 403131 ||  || — || February 24, 2008 || Kitt Peak || Spacewatch || — || align=right | 2.4 km || 
|-id=132 bgcolor=#E9E9E9
| 403132 ||  || — || March 2, 2008 || Kitt Peak || Spacewatch || — || align=right | 2.5 km || 
|-id=133 bgcolor=#E9E9E9
| 403133 ||  || — || March 4, 2008 || Kitt Peak || Spacewatch || — || align=right | 1.9 km || 
|-id=134 bgcolor=#E9E9E9
| 403134 ||  || — || March 5, 2008 || Mount Lemmon || Mount Lemmon Survey || — || align=right | 1.7 km || 
|-id=135 bgcolor=#E9E9E9
| 403135 ||  || — || March 4, 2008 || Mount Lemmon || Mount Lemmon Survey || — || align=right | 2.0 km || 
|-id=136 bgcolor=#E9E9E9
| 403136 ||  || — || February 28, 2008 || Kitt Peak || Spacewatch || AGN || align=right | 1.5 km || 
|-id=137 bgcolor=#d6d6d6
| 403137 ||  || — || March 7, 2008 || Kitt Peak || Spacewatch || URS || align=right | 5.5 km || 
|-id=138 bgcolor=#E9E9E9
| 403138 ||  || — || March 7, 2008 || Kitt Peak || Spacewatch || — || align=right | 2.0 km || 
|-id=139 bgcolor=#d6d6d6
| 403139 ||  || — || March 6, 2008 || Mount Lemmon || Mount Lemmon Survey || — || align=right | 2.7 km || 
|-id=140 bgcolor=#E9E9E9
| 403140 ||  || — || March 5, 2008 || Mount Lemmon || Mount Lemmon Survey || — || align=right | 1.7 km || 
|-id=141 bgcolor=#d6d6d6
| 403141 ||  || — || March 10, 2008 || Kitt Peak || Spacewatch || — || align=right | 2.1 km || 
|-id=142 bgcolor=#E9E9E9
| 403142 ||  || — || March 11, 2008 || Kitt Peak || Spacewatch || AGN || align=right | 1.1 km || 
|-id=143 bgcolor=#E9E9E9
| 403143 ||  || — || February 12, 2008 || Mount Lemmon || Mount Lemmon Survey || — || align=right | 2.4 km || 
|-id=144 bgcolor=#C2FFFF
| 403144 ||  || — || March 11, 2008 || Mount Lemmon || Mount Lemmon Survey || L5 || align=right | 8.2 km || 
|-id=145 bgcolor=#d6d6d6
| 403145 ||  || — || September 30, 2005 || Mount Lemmon || Mount Lemmon Survey || KOR || align=right | 1.3 km || 
|-id=146 bgcolor=#E9E9E9
| 403146 ||  || — || November 17, 2007 || Kitt Peak || Spacewatch || — || align=right | 3.4 km || 
|-id=147 bgcolor=#E9E9E9
| 403147 ||  || — || September 30, 2005 || Mount Lemmon || Mount Lemmon Survey || — || align=right | 2.3 km || 
|-id=148 bgcolor=#E9E9E9
| 403148 ||  || — || March 27, 2008 || Kitt Peak || Spacewatch || — || align=right | 1.7 km || 
|-id=149 bgcolor=#d6d6d6
| 403149 ||  || — || March 27, 2008 || Kitt Peak || Spacewatch || — || align=right | 2.5 km || 
|-id=150 bgcolor=#E9E9E9
| 403150 ||  || — || March 28, 2008 || Kitt Peak || Spacewatch || — || align=right | 1.6 km || 
|-id=151 bgcolor=#d6d6d6
| 403151 ||  || — || February 26, 2008 || Mount Lemmon || Mount Lemmon Survey || — || align=right | 2.7 km || 
|-id=152 bgcolor=#E9E9E9
| 403152 ||  || — || March 30, 2008 || Kitt Peak || Spacewatch || — || align=right | 2.5 km || 
|-id=153 bgcolor=#E9E9E9
| 403153 ||  || — || March 29, 2008 || Mount Lemmon || Mount Lemmon Survey || — || align=right | 2.4 km || 
|-id=154 bgcolor=#d6d6d6
| 403154 ||  || — || March 29, 2008 || Kitt Peak || Spacewatch || — || align=right | 3.5 km || 
|-id=155 bgcolor=#E9E9E9
| 403155 ||  || — || March 30, 2008 || Kitt Peak || Spacewatch || HOF || align=right | 2.7 km || 
|-id=156 bgcolor=#d6d6d6
| 403156 ||  || — || March 30, 2008 || Kitt Peak || Spacewatch || — || align=right | 2.9 km || 
|-id=157 bgcolor=#d6d6d6
| 403157 ||  || — || March 30, 2008 || Kitt Peak || Spacewatch || — || align=right | 2.8 km || 
|-id=158 bgcolor=#d6d6d6
| 403158 ||  || — || March 31, 2008 || Kitt Peak || Spacewatch || KOR || align=right | 1.2 km || 
|-id=159 bgcolor=#d6d6d6
| 403159 ||  || — || March 31, 2008 || Kitt Peak || Spacewatch || — || align=right | 2.8 km || 
|-id=160 bgcolor=#d6d6d6
| 403160 ||  || — || March 27, 2008 || Kitt Peak || Spacewatch || — || align=right | 1.9 km || 
|-id=161 bgcolor=#d6d6d6
| 403161 ||  || — || March 31, 2008 || Mount Lemmon || Mount Lemmon Survey || — || align=right | 2.9 km || 
|-id=162 bgcolor=#d6d6d6
| 403162 ||  || — || March 30, 2008 || Kitt Peak || Spacewatch || — || align=right | 2.2 km || 
|-id=163 bgcolor=#E9E9E9
| 403163 ||  || — || March 31, 2008 || Mount Lemmon || Mount Lemmon Survey || — || align=right | 2.6 km || 
|-id=164 bgcolor=#E9E9E9
| 403164 ||  || — || March 27, 2008 || Mount Lemmon || Mount Lemmon Survey || — || align=right | 1.3 km || 
|-id=165 bgcolor=#d6d6d6
| 403165 ||  || — || April 5, 2008 || Mount Lemmon || Mount Lemmon Survey || KOR || align=right | 1.3 km || 
|-id=166 bgcolor=#E9E9E9
| 403166 ||  || — || April 6, 2008 || Mount Lemmon || Mount Lemmon Survey || — || align=right | 2.7 km || 
|-id=167 bgcolor=#d6d6d6
| 403167 ||  || — || March 28, 2008 || Kitt Peak || Spacewatch || EOS || align=right | 2.0 km || 
|-id=168 bgcolor=#d6d6d6
| 403168 ||  || — || April 10, 2008 || Kitt Peak || Spacewatch || — || align=right | 3.3 km || 
|-id=169 bgcolor=#d6d6d6
| 403169 ||  || — || April 11, 2008 || Kitt Peak || Spacewatch || — || align=right | 3.1 km || 
|-id=170 bgcolor=#E9E9E9
| 403170 ||  || — || April 13, 2008 || Mount Lemmon || Mount Lemmon Survey || (5) || align=right | 1.2 km || 
|-id=171 bgcolor=#d6d6d6
| 403171 ||  || — || April 14, 2008 || Mount Lemmon || Mount Lemmon Survey || — || align=right | 2.1 km || 
|-id=172 bgcolor=#E9E9E9
| 403172 ||  || — || April 3, 2008 || Kitt Peak || Spacewatch || — || align=right | 2.5 km || 
|-id=173 bgcolor=#E9E9E9
| 403173 ||  || — || August 30, 2005 || Kitt Peak || Spacewatch || — || align=right | 2.3 km || 
|-id=174 bgcolor=#d6d6d6
| 403174 ||  || — || April 4, 2008 || Mount Lemmon || Mount Lemmon Survey || — || align=right | 2.8 km || 
|-id=175 bgcolor=#d6d6d6
| 403175 ||  || — || April 14, 2008 || Mount Lemmon || Mount Lemmon Survey || — || align=right | 3.4 km || 
|-id=176 bgcolor=#d6d6d6
| 403176 ||  || — || April 24, 2008 || Mount Lemmon || Mount Lemmon Survey || — || align=right | 2.6 km || 
|-id=177 bgcolor=#d6d6d6
| 403177 ||  || — || April 1, 2008 || Kitt Peak || Spacewatch || EOS || align=right | 1.8 km || 
|-id=178 bgcolor=#d6d6d6
| 403178 ||  || — || September 26, 2005 || Kitt Peak || Spacewatch || KOR || align=right | 1.4 km || 
|-id=179 bgcolor=#d6d6d6
| 403179 ||  || — || April 14, 2008 || Kitt Peak || Spacewatch || — || align=right | 2.0 km || 
|-id=180 bgcolor=#d6d6d6
| 403180 ||  || — || April 29, 2008 || Kitt Peak || Spacewatch || — || align=right | 2.3 km || 
|-id=181 bgcolor=#d6d6d6
| 403181 ||  || — || April 30, 2008 || Mount Lemmon || Mount Lemmon Survey || — || align=right | 2.0 km || 
|-id=182 bgcolor=#d6d6d6
| 403182 ||  || — || April 30, 2008 || Kitt Peak || Spacewatch || — || align=right | 3.1 km || 
|-id=183 bgcolor=#d6d6d6
| 403183 ||  || — || April 26, 2008 || Mount Lemmon || Mount Lemmon Survey || — || align=right | 2.5 km || 
|-id=184 bgcolor=#d6d6d6
| 403184 ||  || — || May 3, 2008 || Mount Lemmon || Mount Lemmon Survey || — || align=right | 2.9 km || 
|-id=185 bgcolor=#d6d6d6
| 403185 ||  || — || May 6, 2008 || Kitt Peak || Spacewatch || — || align=right | 2.8 km || 
|-id=186 bgcolor=#d6d6d6
| 403186 ||  || — || May 3, 2008 || Catalina || CSS || — || align=right | 3.0 km || 
|-id=187 bgcolor=#d6d6d6
| 403187 ||  || — || May 3, 2008 || Mount Lemmon || Mount Lemmon Survey || — || align=right | 2.7 km || 
|-id=188 bgcolor=#d6d6d6
| 403188 ||  || — || May 7, 2008 || Kitt Peak || Spacewatch || — || align=right | 2.7 km || 
|-id=189 bgcolor=#d6d6d6
| 403189 ||  || — || May 28, 2008 || Kitt Peak || Spacewatch || — || align=right | 2.4 km || 
|-id=190 bgcolor=#d6d6d6
| 403190 ||  || — || April 6, 2008 || Mount Lemmon || Mount Lemmon Survey || EOS || align=right | 2.0 km || 
|-id=191 bgcolor=#d6d6d6
| 403191 ||  || — || May 29, 2008 || Mount Lemmon || Mount Lemmon Survey || — || align=right | 3.3 km || 
|-id=192 bgcolor=#d6d6d6
| 403192 ||  || — || May 30, 2008 || Kitt Peak || Spacewatch || — || align=right | 2.4 km || 
|-id=193 bgcolor=#d6d6d6
| 403193 ||  || — || May 13, 2008 || Mount Lemmon || Mount Lemmon Survey || — || align=right | 3.4 km || 
|-id=194 bgcolor=#d6d6d6
| 403194 ||  || — || June 2, 2008 || Kitt Peak || Spacewatch || — || align=right | 2.5 km || 
|-id=195 bgcolor=#d6d6d6
| 403195 ||  || — || June 10, 2008 || Magdalena Ridge || W. H. Ryan || HYG || align=right | 2.1 km || 
|-id=196 bgcolor=#d6d6d6
| 403196 ||  || — || June 8, 2007 || Kitt Peak || Spacewatch || 7:4 || align=right | 5.4 km || 
|-id=197 bgcolor=#d6d6d6
| 403197 ||  || — || August 26, 2008 || Socorro || LINEAR || — || align=right | 5.5 km || 
|-id=198 bgcolor=#FA8072
| 403198 ||  || — || September 6, 2008 || Catalina || CSS || — || align=right | 2.0 km || 
|-id=199 bgcolor=#d6d6d6
| 403199 ||  || — || September 3, 2008 || Kitt Peak || Spacewatch || 7:4 || align=right | 4.7 km || 
|-id=200 bgcolor=#d6d6d6
| 403200 ||  || — || September 20, 2008 || Kitt Peak || Spacewatch || SHU3:2 || align=right | 5.3 km || 
|}

403201–403300 

|-bgcolor=#d6d6d6
| 403201 ||  || — || September 22, 2008 || Kitt Peak || Spacewatch || HYG || align=right | 2.4 km || 
|-id=202 bgcolor=#d6d6d6
| 403202 ||  || — || September 21, 2008 || Kitt Peak || Spacewatch || — || align=right | 4.3 km || 
|-id=203 bgcolor=#fefefe
| 403203 ||  || — || September 25, 2008 || Kitt Peak || Spacewatch || — || align=right data-sort-value="0.56" | 560 m || 
|-id=204 bgcolor=#fefefe
| 403204 ||  || — || September 26, 2008 || Kitt Peak || Spacewatch || — || align=right data-sort-value="0.64" | 640 m || 
|-id=205 bgcolor=#fefefe
| 403205 ||  || — || September 20, 2008 || Kitt Peak || Spacewatch || — || align=right data-sort-value="0.55" | 550 m || 
|-id=206 bgcolor=#fefefe
| 403206 ||  || — || October 4, 2008 || La Sagra || OAM Obs. || — || align=right data-sort-value="0.64" | 640 m || 
|-id=207 bgcolor=#fefefe
| 403207 ||  || — || October 1, 2008 || Mount Lemmon || Mount Lemmon Survey || — || align=right data-sort-value="0.88" | 880 m || 
|-id=208 bgcolor=#fefefe
| 403208 ||  || — || October 1, 2008 || Kitt Peak || Spacewatch || — || align=right data-sort-value="0.57" | 570 m || 
|-id=209 bgcolor=#fefefe
| 403209 ||  || — || March 26, 2003 || Kitt Peak || Spacewatch || — || align=right data-sort-value="0.90" | 900 m || 
|-id=210 bgcolor=#fefefe
| 403210 ||  || — || October 2, 2008 || Kitt Peak || Spacewatch || — || align=right data-sort-value="0.52" | 520 m || 
|-id=211 bgcolor=#fefefe
| 403211 ||  || — || September 4, 2008 || Kitt Peak || Spacewatch || — || align=right data-sort-value="0.53" | 530 m || 
|-id=212 bgcolor=#fefefe
| 403212 ||  || — || September 23, 2008 || Catalina || CSS || — || align=right data-sort-value="0.83" | 830 m || 
|-id=213 bgcolor=#fefefe
| 403213 ||  || — || October 8, 2008 || Kitt Peak || Spacewatch || — || align=right data-sort-value="0.59" | 590 m || 
|-id=214 bgcolor=#fefefe
| 403214 ||  || — || October 8, 2008 || Mount Lemmon || Mount Lemmon Survey || — || align=right data-sort-value="0.60" | 600 m || 
|-id=215 bgcolor=#fefefe
| 403215 ||  || — || October 2, 2008 || Socorro || LINEAR || — || align=right data-sort-value="0.60" | 600 m || 
|-id=216 bgcolor=#fefefe
| 403216 ||  || — || October 8, 2008 || Mount Lemmon || Mount Lemmon Survey || — || align=right data-sort-value="0.63" | 630 m || 
|-id=217 bgcolor=#fefefe
| 403217 ||  || — || October 21, 2008 || Kitt Peak || Spacewatch || — || align=right data-sort-value="0.67" | 670 m || 
|-id=218 bgcolor=#fefefe
| 403218 ||  || — || December 3, 2005 || Kitt Peak || Spacewatch || — || align=right data-sort-value="0.57" | 570 m || 
|-id=219 bgcolor=#fefefe
| 403219 ||  || — || October 8, 2008 || Kitt Peak || Spacewatch || — || align=right data-sort-value="0.59" | 590 m || 
|-id=220 bgcolor=#fefefe
| 403220 ||  || — || October 22, 2008 || Kitt Peak || Spacewatch || — || align=right data-sort-value="0.73" | 730 m || 
|-id=221 bgcolor=#fefefe
| 403221 ||  || — || October 23, 2008 || Kitt Peak || Spacewatch || — || align=right data-sort-value="0.42" | 420 m || 
|-id=222 bgcolor=#fefefe
| 403222 ||  || — || October 23, 2008 || Kitt Peak || Spacewatch || — || align=right data-sort-value="0.58" | 580 m || 
|-id=223 bgcolor=#fefefe
| 403223 ||  || — || October 6, 2008 || Catalina || CSS || — || align=right data-sort-value="0.68" | 680 m || 
|-id=224 bgcolor=#fefefe
| 403224 ||  || — || October 1, 2008 || Mount Lemmon || Mount Lemmon Survey || — || align=right data-sort-value="0.52" | 520 m || 
|-id=225 bgcolor=#fefefe
| 403225 ||  || — || October 25, 2008 || Kitt Peak || Spacewatch || — || align=right data-sort-value="0.64" | 640 m || 
|-id=226 bgcolor=#fefefe
| 403226 ||  || — || October 25, 2008 || Kitt Peak || Spacewatch || — || align=right data-sort-value="0.56" | 560 m || 
|-id=227 bgcolor=#FA8072
| 403227 ||  || — || October 25, 2008 || Mount Lemmon || Mount Lemmon Survey || — || align=right data-sort-value="0.74" | 740 m || 
|-id=228 bgcolor=#fefefe
| 403228 ||  || — || October 26, 2008 || Kitt Peak || Spacewatch || — || align=right data-sort-value="0.81" | 810 m || 
|-id=229 bgcolor=#fefefe
| 403229 ||  || — || October 20, 2008 || Kitt Peak || Spacewatch || — || align=right data-sort-value="0.67" | 670 m || 
|-id=230 bgcolor=#fefefe
| 403230 ||  || — || October 28, 2008 || Mount Lemmon || Mount Lemmon Survey || — || align=right data-sort-value="0.75" | 750 m || 
|-id=231 bgcolor=#fefefe
| 403231 ||  || — || October 28, 2008 || Mount Lemmon || Mount Lemmon Survey || — || align=right data-sort-value="0.70" | 700 m || 
|-id=232 bgcolor=#fefefe
| 403232 ||  || — || September 23, 2008 || Kitt Peak || Spacewatch || — || align=right data-sort-value="0.60" | 600 m || 
|-id=233 bgcolor=#fefefe
| 403233 ||  || — || October 21, 2008 || Kitt Peak || Spacewatch || — || align=right data-sort-value="0.67" | 670 m || 
|-id=234 bgcolor=#fefefe
| 403234 ||  || — || October 25, 2008 || Kitt Peak || Spacewatch || — || align=right data-sort-value="0.94" | 940 m || 
|-id=235 bgcolor=#fefefe
| 403235 ||  || — || October 28, 2008 || Mount Lemmon || Mount Lemmon Survey || — || align=right data-sort-value="0.70" | 700 m || 
|-id=236 bgcolor=#fefefe
| 403236 ||  || — || October 20, 2008 || Kitt Peak || Spacewatch || — || align=right data-sort-value="0.72" | 720 m || 
|-id=237 bgcolor=#d6d6d6
| 403237 ||  || — || November 2, 2008 || Mount Lemmon || Mount Lemmon Survey || 3:2 || align=right | 5.1 km || 
|-id=238 bgcolor=#fefefe
| 403238 ||  || — || November 1, 2008 || Kitt Peak || Spacewatch || (2076) || align=right data-sort-value="0.69" | 690 m || 
|-id=239 bgcolor=#fefefe
| 403239 ||  || — || November 7, 2008 || Mount Lemmon || Mount Lemmon Survey || — || align=right data-sort-value="0.67" | 670 m || 
|-id=240 bgcolor=#d6d6d6
| 403240 ||  || — || November 7, 2008 || Mount Lemmon || Mount Lemmon Survey || 3:2 || align=right | 4.8 km || 
|-id=241 bgcolor=#fefefe
| 403241 ||  || — || November 1, 2008 || Mount Lemmon || Mount Lemmon Survey || — || align=right data-sort-value="0.88" | 880 m || 
|-id=242 bgcolor=#FA8072
| 403242 ||  || — || November 19, 2008 || Mount Lemmon || Mount Lemmon Survey || — || align=right data-sort-value="0.70" | 700 m || 
|-id=243 bgcolor=#fefefe
| 403243 ||  || — || January 30, 2006 || Kitt Peak || Spacewatch || — || align=right data-sort-value="0.71" | 710 m || 
|-id=244 bgcolor=#fefefe
| 403244 ||  || — || May 25, 2007 || Mount Lemmon || Mount Lemmon Survey || — || align=right data-sort-value="0.78" | 780 m || 
|-id=245 bgcolor=#fefefe
| 403245 ||  || — || November 20, 2008 || Socorro || LINEAR || — || align=right data-sort-value="0.84" | 840 m || 
|-id=246 bgcolor=#fefefe
| 403246 || 2008 XT || — || December 1, 2008 || Jarnac || Jarnac Obs. || — || align=right data-sort-value="0.84" | 840 m || 
|-id=247 bgcolor=#FFC2E0
| 403247 ||  || — || December 5, 2008 || Mount Lemmon || Mount Lemmon Survey || AMO || align=right data-sort-value="0.50" | 500 m || 
|-id=248 bgcolor=#fefefe
| 403248 ||  || — || November 3, 2008 || Mount Lemmon || Mount Lemmon Survey || — || align=right data-sort-value="0.61" | 610 m || 
|-id=249 bgcolor=#fefefe
| 403249 ||  || — || December 2, 2008 || Kitt Peak || Spacewatch || — || align=right data-sort-value="0.73" | 730 m || 
|-id=250 bgcolor=#fefefe
| 403250 ||  || — || November 19, 2008 || Kitt Peak || Spacewatch || — || align=right data-sort-value="0.90" | 900 m || 
|-id=251 bgcolor=#fefefe
| 403251 ||  || — || December 19, 2008 || Lulin || LUSS || V || align=right data-sort-value="0.80" | 800 m || 
|-id=252 bgcolor=#fefefe
| 403252 ||  || — || November 18, 2008 || Kitt Peak || Spacewatch || — || align=right data-sort-value="0.84" | 840 m || 
|-id=253 bgcolor=#fefefe
| 403253 ||  || — || December 21, 2008 || Socorro || LINEAR || — || align=right data-sort-value="0.83" | 830 m || 
|-id=254 bgcolor=#fefefe
| 403254 ||  || — || December 21, 2008 || Kitt Peak || Spacewatch || — || align=right data-sort-value="0.82" | 820 m || 
|-id=255 bgcolor=#fefefe
| 403255 ||  || — || February 12, 2002 || Kitt Peak || Spacewatch || — || align=right data-sort-value="0.75" | 750 m || 
|-id=256 bgcolor=#fefefe
| 403256 ||  || — || November 8, 2008 || Mount Lemmon || Mount Lemmon Survey || — || align=right | 1.2 km || 
|-id=257 bgcolor=#fefefe
| 403257 ||  || — || December 30, 2008 || Kitt Peak || Spacewatch || — || align=right data-sort-value="0.55" | 550 m || 
|-id=258 bgcolor=#fefefe
| 403258 ||  || — || December 30, 2008 || Mount Lemmon || Mount Lemmon Survey || — || align=right data-sort-value="0.61" | 610 m || 
|-id=259 bgcolor=#fefefe
| 403259 ||  || — || December 30, 2008 || Mount Lemmon || Mount Lemmon Survey || — || align=right | 1.0 km || 
|-id=260 bgcolor=#fefefe
| 403260 ||  || — || December 30, 2008 || Mount Lemmon || Mount Lemmon Survey || — || align=right data-sort-value="0.89" | 890 m || 
|-id=261 bgcolor=#fefefe
| 403261 ||  || — || December 29, 2008 || Kitt Peak || Spacewatch || V || align=right data-sort-value="0.65" | 650 m || 
|-id=262 bgcolor=#fefefe
| 403262 ||  || — || December 30, 2008 || Kitt Peak || Spacewatch || — || align=right data-sort-value="0.65" | 650 m || 
|-id=263 bgcolor=#fefefe
| 403263 ||  || — || December 4, 2008 || Mount Lemmon || Mount Lemmon Survey || — || align=right data-sort-value="0.82" | 820 m || 
|-id=264 bgcolor=#fefefe
| 403264 ||  || — || October 5, 2004 || Kitt Peak || Spacewatch || — || align=right | 1.0 km || 
|-id=265 bgcolor=#fefefe
| 403265 ||  || — || December 30, 2008 || Mount Lemmon || Mount Lemmon Survey || — || align=right data-sort-value="0.71" | 710 m || 
|-id=266 bgcolor=#fefefe
| 403266 ||  || — || December 30, 2008 || Kitt Peak || Spacewatch || — || align=right data-sort-value="0.73" | 730 m || 
|-id=267 bgcolor=#fefefe
| 403267 ||  || — || December 22, 2008 || Kitt Peak || Spacewatch || — || align=right data-sort-value="0.81" | 810 m || 
|-id=268 bgcolor=#fefefe
| 403268 ||  || — || January 7, 2002 || Kitt Peak || Spacewatch || — || align=right data-sort-value="0.69" | 690 m || 
|-id=269 bgcolor=#fefefe
| 403269 ||  || — || December 21, 2008 || Kitt Peak || Spacewatch || — || align=right | 1.0 km || 
|-id=270 bgcolor=#fefefe
| 403270 ||  || — || December 30, 2008 || Kitt Peak || Spacewatch || — || align=right data-sort-value="0.69" | 690 m || 
|-id=271 bgcolor=#fefefe
| 403271 ||  || — || January 2, 2009 || Mount Lemmon || Mount Lemmon Survey || — || align=right data-sort-value="0.94" | 940 m || 
|-id=272 bgcolor=#fefefe
| 403272 ||  || — || January 2, 2009 || Mount Lemmon || Mount Lemmon Survey || — || align=right data-sort-value="0.64" | 640 m || 
|-id=273 bgcolor=#fefefe
| 403273 ||  || — || November 23, 2008 || Mount Lemmon || Mount Lemmon Survey || NYS || align=right data-sort-value="0.73" | 730 m || 
|-id=274 bgcolor=#fefefe
| 403274 ||  || — || January 3, 2009 || Kitt Peak || Spacewatch || — || align=right data-sort-value="0.89" | 890 m || 
|-id=275 bgcolor=#fefefe
| 403275 ||  || — || January 15, 2009 || Kitt Peak || Spacewatch || — || align=right data-sort-value="0.66" | 660 m || 
|-id=276 bgcolor=#fefefe
| 403276 ||  || — || November 24, 2008 || Mount Lemmon || Mount Lemmon Survey || — || align=right data-sort-value="0.92" | 920 m || 
|-id=277 bgcolor=#fefefe
| 403277 ||  || — || January 3, 2009 || Mount Lemmon || Mount Lemmon Survey || — || align=right | 1.1 km || 
|-id=278 bgcolor=#fefefe
| 403278 ||  || — || January 2, 2009 || Kitt Peak || Spacewatch || — || align=right data-sort-value="0.76" | 760 m || 
|-id=279 bgcolor=#fefefe
| 403279 ||  || — || November 24, 2008 || Mount Lemmon || Mount Lemmon Survey || NYS || align=right data-sort-value="0.87" | 870 m || 
|-id=280 bgcolor=#fefefe
| 403280 ||  || — || January 1, 2009 || Mount Lemmon || Mount Lemmon Survey || — || align=right data-sort-value="0.75" | 750 m || 
|-id=281 bgcolor=#fefefe
| 403281 ||  || — || December 1, 2008 || Mount Lemmon || Mount Lemmon Survey || — || align=right data-sort-value="0.84" | 840 m || 
|-id=282 bgcolor=#fefefe
| 403282 ||  || — || September 5, 2007 || Mount Lemmon || Mount Lemmon Survey || — || align=right data-sort-value="0.84" | 840 m || 
|-id=283 bgcolor=#fefefe
| 403283 ||  || — || December 4, 2008 || Mount Lemmon || Mount Lemmon Survey || — || align=right data-sort-value="0.98" | 980 m || 
|-id=284 bgcolor=#fefefe
| 403284 ||  || — || January 16, 2009 || Kitt Peak || Spacewatch || — || align=right data-sort-value="0.68" | 680 m || 
|-id=285 bgcolor=#fefefe
| 403285 ||  || — || January 16, 2009 || Mount Lemmon || Mount Lemmon Survey || — || align=right data-sort-value="0.70" | 700 m || 
|-id=286 bgcolor=#fefefe
| 403286 ||  || — || January 17, 2009 || Mount Lemmon || Mount Lemmon Survey || — || align=right data-sort-value="0.86" | 860 m || 
|-id=287 bgcolor=#fefefe
| 403287 ||  || — || January 18, 2009 || Mount Lemmon || Mount Lemmon Survey || — || align=right data-sort-value="0.83" | 830 m || 
|-id=288 bgcolor=#fefefe
| 403288 ||  || — || January 20, 2009 || Catalina || CSS || — || align=right data-sort-value="0.79" | 790 m || 
|-id=289 bgcolor=#fefefe
| 403289 ||  || — || December 31, 2008 || Mount Lemmon || Mount Lemmon Survey || — || align=right data-sort-value="0.72" | 720 m || 
|-id=290 bgcolor=#fefefe
| 403290 ||  || — || December 3, 2008 || Mount Lemmon || Mount Lemmon Survey || V || align=right data-sort-value="0.87" | 870 m || 
|-id=291 bgcolor=#fefefe
| 403291 ||  || — || January 25, 2009 || Kitt Peak || Spacewatch || — || align=right data-sort-value="0.54" | 540 m || 
|-id=292 bgcolor=#fefefe
| 403292 ||  || — || January 25, 2009 || Catalina || CSS || — || align=right data-sort-value="0.95" | 950 m || 
|-id=293 bgcolor=#fefefe
| 403293 ||  || — || January 16, 2009 || Kitt Peak || Spacewatch || — || align=right data-sort-value="0.63" | 630 m || 
|-id=294 bgcolor=#fefefe
| 403294 ||  || — || January 17, 2009 || Kitt Peak || Spacewatch || — || align=right | 1.0 km || 
|-id=295 bgcolor=#fefefe
| 403295 ||  || — || January 29, 2009 || Mount Lemmon || Mount Lemmon Survey || NYS || align=right data-sort-value="0.63" | 630 m || 
|-id=296 bgcolor=#E9E9E9
| 403296 ||  || — || January 30, 2009 || Mount Lemmon || Mount Lemmon Survey || — || align=right data-sort-value="0.83" | 830 m || 
|-id=297 bgcolor=#E9E9E9
| 403297 ||  || — || January 29, 2009 || Kitt Peak || Spacewatch || — || align=right | 1.1 km || 
|-id=298 bgcolor=#fefefe
| 403298 ||  || — || January 30, 2009 || Kitt Peak || Spacewatch || — || align=right data-sort-value="0.69" | 690 m || 
|-id=299 bgcolor=#fefefe
| 403299 ||  || — || January 31, 2009 || Kitt Peak || Spacewatch || — || align=right data-sort-value="0.98" | 980 m || 
|-id=300 bgcolor=#E9E9E9
| 403300 ||  || — || October 9, 2007 || Mount Lemmon || Mount Lemmon Survey || — || align=right data-sort-value="0.86" | 860 m || 
|}

403301–403400 

|-bgcolor=#fefefe
| 403301 ||  || — || January 31, 2009 || Kitt Peak || Spacewatch || — || align=right data-sort-value="0.66" | 660 m || 
|-id=302 bgcolor=#fefefe
| 403302 ||  || — || January 20, 2009 || Mount Lemmon || Mount Lemmon Survey || — || align=right | 1.1 km || 
|-id=303 bgcolor=#fefefe
| 403303 ||  || — || September 11, 2007 || Mount Lemmon || Mount Lemmon Survey || — || align=right data-sort-value="0.70" | 700 m || 
|-id=304 bgcolor=#fefefe
| 403304 ||  || — || January 17, 2009 || Kitt Peak || Spacewatch || — || align=right | 1.1 km || 
|-id=305 bgcolor=#fefefe
| 403305 ||  || — || October 11, 2004 || Kitt Peak || Spacewatch || — || align=right | 2.0 km || 
|-id=306 bgcolor=#E9E9E9
| 403306 ||  || — || January 31, 2009 || Mount Lemmon || Mount Lemmon Survey || — || align=right | 1.00 km || 
|-id=307 bgcolor=#fefefe
| 403307 ||  || — || February 14, 2009 || Heppenheim || Starkenburg Obs. || V || align=right data-sort-value="0.55" | 550 m || 
|-id=308 bgcolor=#fefefe
| 403308 ||  || — || January 20, 2009 || Mount Lemmon || Mount Lemmon Survey || — || align=right | 1.1 km || 
|-id=309 bgcolor=#fefefe
| 403309 ||  || — || February 1, 2009 || Kitt Peak || Spacewatch || V || align=right data-sort-value="0.80" | 800 m || 
|-id=310 bgcolor=#fefefe
| 403310 ||  || — || February 1, 2009 || Kitt Peak || Spacewatch || MAS || align=right data-sort-value="0.63" | 630 m || 
|-id=311 bgcolor=#E9E9E9
| 403311 ||  || — || December 22, 2008 || Mount Lemmon || Mount Lemmon Survey || — || align=right data-sort-value="0.90" | 900 m || 
|-id=312 bgcolor=#E9E9E9
| 403312 ||  || — || February 1, 2009 || Kitt Peak || Spacewatch || — || align=right | 1.6 km || 
|-id=313 bgcolor=#fefefe
| 403313 ||  || — || February 1, 2009 || Kitt Peak || Spacewatch || — || align=right data-sort-value="0.63" | 630 m || 
|-id=314 bgcolor=#fefefe
| 403314 ||  || — || February 1, 2009 || Kitt Peak || Spacewatch || — || align=right data-sort-value="0.77" | 770 m || 
|-id=315 bgcolor=#fefefe
| 403315 ||  || — || February 14, 2009 || Catalina || CSS || — || align=right | 1.3 km || 
|-id=316 bgcolor=#fefefe
| 403316 ||  || — || January 17, 2009 || Mount Lemmon || Mount Lemmon Survey || NYS || align=right data-sort-value="0.61" | 610 m || 
|-id=317 bgcolor=#E9E9E9
| 403317 ||  || — || February 15, 2009 || Catalina || CSS || — || align=right data-sort-value="0.91" | 910 m || 
|-id=318 bgcolor=#fefefe
| 403318 ||  || — || February 4, 2009 || Kitt Peak || Spacewatch || — || align=right | 1.0 km || 
|-id=319 bgcolor=#E9E9E9
| 403319 ||  || — || February 19, 2009 || Mount Lemmon || Mount Lemmon Survey || JUN || align=right data-sort-value="0.80" | 800 m || 
|-id=320 bgcolor=#fefefe
| 403320 ||  || — || February 16, 2009 || La Sagra || OAM Obs. || — || align=right data-sort-value="0.83" | 830 m || 
|-id=321 bgcolor=#fefefe
| 403321 ||  || — || February 19, 2009 || Kitt Peak || Spacewatch || — || align=right data-sort-value="0.80" | 800 m || 
|-id=322 bgcolor=#fefefe
| 403322 ||  || — || February 21, 2009 || Catalina || CSS || — || align=right | 1.0 km || 
|-id=323 bgcolor=#fefefe
| 403323 ||  || — || January 18, 2009 || Kitt Peak || Spacewatch || — || align=right data-sort-value="0.71" | 710 m || 
|-id=324 bgcolor=#fefefe
| 403324 ||  || — || February 19, 2009 || Kitt Peak || Spacewatch || — || align=right data-sort-value="0.80" | 800 m || 
|-id=325 bgcolor=#fefefe
| 403325 ||  || — || January 1, 2009 || Mount Lemmon || Mount Lemmon Survey || — || align=right data-sort-value="0.61" | 610 m || 
|-id=326 bgcolor=#fefefe
| 403326 ||  || — || January 31, 2009 || Kitt Peak || Spacewatch || — || align=right data-sort-value="0.72" | 720 m || 
|-id=327 bgcolor=#fefefe
| 403327 ||  || — || August 23, 2007 || Kitt Peak || Spacewatch || — || align=right data-sort-value="0.83" | 830 m || 
|-id=328 bgcolor=#d6d6d6
| 403328 ||  || — || November 19, 2007 || Kitt Peak || Spacewatch || — || align=right | 2.4 km || 
|-id=329 bgcolor=#fefefe
| 403329 ||  || — || February 22, 2009 || Kitt Peak || Spacewatch || — || align=right data-sort-value="0.87" | 870 m || 
|-id=330 bgcolor=#fefefe
| 403330 ||  || — || February 26, 2009 || Catalina || CSS || NYS || align=right data-sort-value="0.59" | 590 m || 
|-id=331 bgcolor=#fefefe
| 403331 ||  || — || February 4, 2009 || Mount Lemmon || Mount Lemmon Survey || — || align=right data-sort-value="0.84" | 840 m || 
|-id=332 bgcolor=#fefefe
| 403332 ||  || — || February 27, 2009 || Kitt Peak || Spacewatch || V || align=right data-sort-value="0.62" | 620 m || 
|-id=333 bgcolor=#E9E9E9
| 403333 ||  || — || February 27, 2009 || Kitt Peak || Spacewatch || AEO || align=right | 1.1 km || 
|-id=334 bgcolor=#E9E9E9
| 403334 ||  || — || February 28, 2009 || Mount Lemmon || Mount Lemmon Survey || — || align=right | 1.6 km || 
|-id=335 bgcolor=#fefefe
| 403335 ||  || — || February 28, 2009 || Mount Lemmon || Mount Lemmon Survey || — || align=right data-sort-value="0.77" | 770 m || 
|-id=336 bgcolor=#fefefe
| 403336 ||  || — || February 27, 2009 || Catalina || CSS || NYS || align=right data-sort-value="0.66" | 660 m || 
|-id=337 bgcolor=#fefefe
| 403337 ||  || — || February 27, 2009 || Kitt Peak || Spacewatch || — || align=right data-sort-value="0.80" | 800 m || 
|-id=338 bgcolor=#fefefe
| 403338 ||  || — || February 19, 2009 || Kitt Peak || Spacewatch || — || align=right data-sort-value="0.86" | 860 m || 
|-id=339 bgcolor=#E9E9E9
| 403339 ||  || — || February 20, 2009 || Kitt Peak || Spacewatch || — || align=right | 1.1 km || 
|-id=340 bgcolor=#fefefe
| 403340 ||  || — || February 19, 2009 || Kitt Peak || Spacewatch || MAS || align=right data-sort-value="0.91" | 910 m || 
|-id=341 bgcolor=#E9E9E9
| 403341 ||  || — || March 17, 2005 || Mount Lemmon || Mount Lemmon Survey || — || align=right data-sort-value="0.92" | 920 m || 
|-id=342 bgcolor=#fefefe
| 403342 ||  || — || February 28, 2009 || Kitt Peak || Spacewatch || — || align=right data-sort-value="0.83" | 830 m || 
|-id=343 bgcolor=#E9E9E9
| 403343 ||  || — || March 3, 2009 || Catalina || CSS || EUN || align=right | 2.2 km || 
|-id=344 bgcolor=#fefefe
| 403344 ||  || — || October 25, 2003 || Kitt Peak || Spacewatch || — || align=right data-sort-value="0.76" | 760 m || 
|-id=345 bgcolor=#d6d6d6
| 403345 ||  || — || August 27, 2006 || Kitt Peak || Spacewatch || KOR || align=right | 1.4 km || 
|-id=346 bgcolor=#E9E9E9
| 403346 ||  || — || March 2, 2009 || Mount Lemmon || Mount Lemmon Survey || — || align=right | 1.1 km || 
|-id=347 bgcolor=#fefefe
| 403347 ||  || — || March 17, 2009 || La Sagra || OAM Obs. || V || align=right data-sort-value="0.76" | 760 m || 
|-id=348 bgcolor=#fefefe
| 403348 ||  || — || January 25, 2009 || Kitt Peak || Spacewatch || — || align=right data-sort-value="0.68" | 680 m || 
|-id=349 bgcolor=#E9E9E9
| 403349 ||  || — || March 17, 2009 || Siding Spring || SSS || — || align=right | 1.3 km || 
|-id=350 bgcolor=#E9E9E9
| 403350 ||  || — || January 31, 2009 || Mount Lemmon || Mount Lemmon Survey || (5) || align=right data-sort-value="0.88" | 880 m || 
|-id=351 bgcolor=#E9E9E9
| 403351 ||  || — || March 26, 2009 || Mount Lemmon || Mount Lemmon Survey || — || align=right | 1.2 km || 
|-id=352 bgcolor=#E9E9E9
| 403352 ||  || — || March 31, 2009 || Kitt Peak || Spacewatch || — || align=right | 1.4 km || 
|-id=353 bgcolor=#E9E9E9
| 403353 ||  || — || March 18, 2009 || Kitt Peak || Spacewatch || — || align=right | 2.2 km || 
|-id=354 bgcolor=#E9E9E9
| 403354 ||  || — || March 31, 2009 || Kitt Peak || Spacewatch || — || align=right data-sort-value="0.94" | 940 m || 
|-id=355 bgcolor=#E9E9E9
| 403355 ||  || — || March 27, 2009 || Siding Spring || SSS || — || align=right | 1.8 km || 
|-id=356 bgcolor=#E9E9E9
| 403356 ||  || — || March 24, 2009 || Kitt Peak || Spacewatch || — || align=right | 2.4 km || 
|-id=357 bgcolor=#E9E9E9
| 403357 ||  || — || February 27, 2009 || Catalina || CSS || — || align=right | 2.4 km || 
|-id=358 bgcolor=#d6d6d6
| 403358 ||  || — || April 2, 2009 || Mount Lemmon || Mount Lemmon Survey || — || align=right | 2.3 km || 
|-id=359 bgcolor=#E9E9E9
| 403359 ||  || — || April 17, 2009 || Kitt Peak || Spacewatch || — || align=right | 1.1 km || 
|-id=360 bgcolor=#E9E9E9
| 403360 ||  || — || March 7, 2009 || Mount Lemmon || Mount Lemmon Survey || — || align=right | 1.2 km || 
|-id=361 bgcolor=#fefefe
| 403361 ||  || — || April 17, 2009 || Kitt Peak || Spacewatch || — || align=right data-sort-value="0.94" | 940 m || 
|-id=362 bgcolor=#E9E9E9
| 403362 ||  || — || July 21, 2006 || Mount Lemmon || Mount Lemmon Survey || RAF || align=right | 1.2 km || 
|-id=363 bgcolor=#E9E9E9
| 403363 ||  || — || April 20, 2009 || Kitt Peak || Spacewatch || — || align=right | 2.4 km || 
|-id=364 bgcolor=#E9E9E9
| 403364 ||  || — || April 18, 2009 || Kitt Peak || Spacewatch || — || align=right data-sort-value="0.83" | 830 m || 
|-id=365 bgcolor=#d6d6d6
| 403365 ||  || — || April 19, 2009 || Kitt Peak || Spacewatch || — || align=right | 3.1 km || 
|-id=366 bgcolor=#E9E9E9
| 403366 ||  || — || April 19, 2009 || Mount Lemmon || Mount Lemmon Survey || — || align=right data-sort-value="0.74" | 740 m || 
|-id=367 bgcolor=#E9E9E9
| 403367 ||  || — || April 19, 2009 || Kitt Peak || Spacewatch || (1547) || align=right | 1.4 km || 
|-id=368 bgcolor=#E9E9E9
| 403368 ||  || — || April 24, 2009 || Kitt Peak || Spacewatch || — || align=right | 1.1 km || 
|-id=369 bgcolor=#E9E9E9
| 403369 ||  || — || April 27, 2009 || Mount Lemmon || Mount Lemmon Survey || — || align=right | 1.3 km || 
|-id=370 bgcolor=#E9E9E9
| 403370 ||  || — || April 27, 2009 || Kitt Peak || Spacewatch || ADE || align=right | 3.4 km || 
|-id=371 bgcolor=#E9E9E9
| 403371 ||  || — || April 26, 2009 || Kitt Peak || Spacewatch || — || align=right | 1.1 km || 
|-id=372 bgcolor=#fefefe
| 403372 ||  || — || March 19, 2009 || Kitt Peak || Spacewatch || — || align=right | 1.1 km || 
|-id=373 bgcolor=#E9E9E9
| 403373 ||  || — || June 4, 2005 || Kitt Peak || Spacewatch || EUN || align=right | 1.5 km || 
|-id=374 bgcolor=#E9E9E9
| 403374 ||  || — || April 23, 2009 || Kitt Peak || Spacewatch || — || align=right | 1.5 km || 
|-id=375 bgcolor=#E9E9E9
| 403375 ||  || — || April 20, 2009 || Kitt Peak || Spacewatch || BRG || align=right | 1.6 km || 
|-id=376 bgcolor=#E9E9E9
| 403376 ||  || — || March 24, 2009 || Mount Lemmon || Mount Lemmon Survey || — || align=right | 1.0 km || 
|-id=377 bgcolor=#E9E9E9
| 403377 ||  || — || April 20, 2009 || Kitt Peak || Spacewatch || — || align=right | 1.5 km || 
|-id=378 bgcolor=#E9E9E9
| 403378 ||  || — || May 25, 2009 || Kitt Peak || Spacewatch || — || align=right | 2.4 km || 
|-id=379 bgcolor=#d6d6d6
| 403379 ||  || — || May 27, 2009 || Mount Lemmon || Mount Lemmon Survey || — || align=right | 4.3 km || 
|-id=380 bgcolor=#d6d6d6
| 403380 ||  || — || June 15, 2009 || Kitt Peak || Spacewatch || — || align=right | 3.1 km || 
|-id=381 bgcolor=#d6d6d6
| 403381 ||  || — || July 28, 2009 || Kitt Peak || Spacewatch || — || align=right | 3.1 km || 
|-id=382 bgcolor=#d6d6d6
| 403382 ||  || — || December 26, 2005 || Kitt Peak || Spacewatch || EOS || align=right | 2.0 km || 
|-id=383 bgcolor=#d6d6d6
| 403383 ||  || — || August 15, 2009 || Kitt Peak || Spacewatch || — || align=right | 2.2 km || 
|-id=384 bgcolor=#d6d6d6
| 403384 ||  || — || August 15, 2009 || Socorro || LINEAR || — || align=right | 3.6 km || 
|-id=385 bgcolor=#d6d6d6
| 403385 ||  || — || August 15, 2009 || Catalina || CSS || — || align=right | 4.1 km || 
|-id=386 bgcolor=#d6d6d6
| 403386 ||  || — || August 22, 2009 || Sandlot || G. Hug || — || align=right | 2.3 km || 
|-id=387 bgcolor=#d6d6d6
| 403387 ||  || — || August 16, 2009 || Kitt Peak || Spacewatch || — || align=right | 4.0 km || 
|-id=388 bgcolor=#d6d6d6
| 403388 ||  || — || August 16, 2009 || Kitt Peak || Spacewatch || — || align=right | 3.1 km || 
|-id=389 bgcolor=#d6d6d6
| 403389 ||  || — || August 16, 2009 || Kitt Peak || Spacewatch || — || align=right | 3.5 km || 
|-id=390 bgcolor=#d6d6d6
| 403390 ||  || — || August 27, 2009 || Kitt Peak || Spacewatch || EOS || align=right | 2.3 km || 
|-id=391 bgcolor=#d6d6d6
| 403391 ||  || — || August 16, 2009 || Kitt Peak || Spacewatch || EOS || align=right | 2.2 km || 
|-id=392 bgcolor=#d6d6d6
| 403392 ||  || — || August 27, 2009 || Kitt Peak || Spacewatch || — || align=right | 2.7 km || 
|-id=393 bgcolor=#d6d6d6
| 403393 ||  || — || August 28, 2009 || Kitt Peak || Spacewatch || VER || align=right | 2.3 km || 
|-id=394 bgcolor=#d6d6d6
| 403394 ||  || — || August 20, 2009 || Kitt Peak || Spacewatch || — || align=right | 2.5 km || 
|-id=395 bgcolor=#d6d6d6
| 403395 ||  || — || August 20, 2009 || Kitt Peak || Spacewatch || — || align=right | 4.0 km || 
|-id=396 bgcolor=#d6d6d6
| 403396 ||  || — || August 27, 2009 || Kitt Peak || Spacewatch || — || align=right | 2.9 km || 
|-id=397 bgcolor=#d6d6d6
| 403397 ||  || — || August 17, 2009 || Kitt Peak || Spacewatch || — || align=right | 2.8 km || 
|-id=398 bgcolor=#d6d6d6
| 403398 ||  || — || August 15, 2009 || Catalina || CSS || — || align=right | 2.6 km || 
|-id=399 bgcolor=#d6d6d6
| 403399 ||  || — || September 15, 2009 || Kitt Peak || Spacewatch || — || align=right | 3.4 km || 
|-id=400 bgcolor=#d6d6d6
| 403400 ||  || — || December 30, 2005 || Mount Lemmon || Mount Lemmon Survey || — || align=right | 3.7 km || 
|}

403401–403500 

|-bgcolor=#d6d6d6
| 403401 ||  || — || September 15, 2009 || Kitt Peak || Spacewatch || — || align=right | 2.6 km || 
|-id=402 bgcolor=#d6d6d6
| 403402 ||  || — || September 14, 2009 || Socorro || LINEAR || — || align=right | 3.1 km || 
|-id=403 bgcolor=#d6d6d6
| 403403 ||  || — || September 15, 2009 || Kitt Peak || Spacewatch || — || align=right | 3.1 km || 
|-id=404 bgcolor=#d6d6d6
| 403404 ||  || — || September 15, 2009 || Kitt Peak || Spacewatch || THM || align=right | 2.8 km || 
|-id=405 bgcolor=#d6d6d6
| 403405 ||  || — || September 15, 2009 || Kitt Peak || Spacewatch || EOS || align=right | 2.6 km || 
|-id=406 bgcolor=#d6d6d6
| 403406 ||  || — || September 15, 2009 || Kitt Peak || Spacewatch || LIX || align=right | 3.2 km || 
|-id=407 bgcolor=#d6d6d6
| 403407 ||  || — || September 18, 2009 || Bisei SG Center || BATTeRS || — || align=right | 2.8 km || 
|-id=408 bgcolor=#d6d6d6
| 403408 ||  || — || September 17, 2009 || Mount Lemmon || Mount Lemmon Survey || — || align=right | 2.7 km || 
|-id=409 bgcolor=#d6d6d6
| 403409 ||  || — || September 17, 2009 || Moletai || K. Černis, J. Zdanavičius || — || align=right | 4.1 km || 
|-id=410 bgcolor=#d6d6d6
| 403410 ||  || — || September 16, 2009 || Kitt Peak || Spacewatch || — || align=right | 2.7 km || 
|-id=411 bgcolor=#d6d6d6
| 403411 ||  || — || September 16, 2009 || Kitt Peak || Spacewatch || — || align=right | 3.1 km || 
|-id=412 bgcolor=#d6d6d6
| 403412 ||  || — || September 16, 2009 || Kitt Peak || Spacewatch || — || align=right | 3.3 km || 
|-id=413 bgcolor=#d6d6d6
| 403413 ||  || — || September 17, 2009 || Mount Lemmon || Mount Lemmon Survey || — || align=right | 2.2 km || 
|-id=414 bgcolor=#d6d6d6
| 403414 ||  || — || August 15, 2009 || Kitt Peak || Spacewatch || — || align=right | 3.2 km || 
|-id=415 bgcolor=#d6d6d6
| 403415 ||  || — || March 14, 2007 || Mount Lemmon || Mount Lemmon Survey || HYG || align=right | 3.0 km || 
|-id=416 bgcolor=#d6d6d6
| 403416 ||  || — || September 17, 2009 || Kitt Peak || Spacewatch || — || align=right | 2.7 km || 
|-id=417 bgcolor=#d6d6d6
| 403417 ||  || — || September 18, 2009 || Kitt Peak || Spacewatch || — || align=right | 3.4 km || 
|-id=418 bgcolor=#d6d6d6
| 403418 ||  || — || September 18, 2009 || Mount Lemmon || Mount Lemmon Survey || — || align=right | 2.9 km || 
|-id=419 bgcolor=#d6d6d6
| 403419 ||  || — || September 19, 2009 || Kitt Peak || Spacewatch || — || align=right | 2.8 km || 
|-id=420 bgcolor=#d6d6d6
| 403420 ||  || — || August 17, 2009 || Kitt Peak || Spacewatch || — || align=right | 2.6 km || 
|-id=421 bgcolor=#d6d6d6
| 403421 ||  || — || September 18, 2009 || Kitt Peak || Spacewatch || HYG || align=right | 3.3 km || 
|-id=422 bgcolor=#d6d6d6
| 403422 ||  || — || September 18, 2009 || Kitt Peak || Spacewatch || — || align=right | 2.6 km || 
|-id=423 bgcolor=#d6d6d6
| 403423 ||  || — || September 18, 2009 || Kitt Peak || Spacewatch || EOS || align=right | 2.6 km || 
|-id=424 bgcolor=#d6d6d6
| 403424 ||  || — || September 18, 2009 || Mount Lemmon || Mount Lemmon Survey || — || align=right | 2.3 km || 
|-id=425 bgcolor=#d6d6d6
| 403425 ||  || — || September 18, 2009 || Mount Lemmon || Mount Lemmon Survey || — || align=right | 2.3 km || 
|-id=426 bgcolor=#d6d6d6
| 403426 ||  || — || September 18, 2009 || Kitt Peak || Spacewatch || THM || align=right | 2.0 km || 
|-id=427 bgcolor=#d6d6d6
| 403427 ||  || — || September 18, 2009 || Kitt Peak || Spacewatch || — || align=right | 3.1 km || 
|-id=428 bgcolor=#d6d6d6
| 403428 ||  || — || September 18, 2009 || Kitt Peak || Spacewatch || — || align=right | 2.5 km || 
|-id=429 bgcolor=#d6d6d6
| 403429 ||  || — || September 18, 2003 || Kitt Peak || Spacewatch || — || align=right | 3.1 km || 
|-id=430 bgcolor=#d6d6d6
| 403430 ||  || — || September 19, 2009 || Mount Lemmon || Mount Lemmon Survey || — || align=right | 3.8 km || 
|-id=431 bgcolor=#d6d6d6
| 403431 ||  || — || September 21, 2009 || Kitt Peak || Spacewatch || — || align=right | 2.9 km || 
|-id=432 bgcolor=#d6d6d6
| 403432 ||  || — || September 21, 2009 || Kitt Peak || Spacewatch || 7:4 || align=right | 4.1 km || 
|-id=433 bgcolor=#d6d6d6
| 403433 ||  || — || September 17, 2009 || Kitt Peak || Spacewatch || EOS || align=right | 2.1 km || 
|-id=434 bgcolor=#d6d6d6
| 403434 ||  || — || September 21, 2009 || Kitt Peak || Spacewatch || — || align=right | 3.4 km || 
|-id=435 bgcolor=#d6d6d6
| 403435 ||  || — || September 10, 2009 || Catalina || CSS || — || align=right | 3.1 km || 
|-id=436 bgcolor=#d6d6d6
| 403436 ||  || — || September 23, 2009 || Kitt Peak || Spacewatch || — || align=right | 2.9 km || 
|-id=437 bgcolor=#d6d6d6
| 403437 ||  || — || September 23, 2009 || Kitt Peak || Spacewatch || — || align=right | 2.0 km || 
|-id=438 bgcolor=#d6d6d6
| 403438 ||  || — || September 23, 2009 || Kitt Peak || Spacewatch || — || align=right | 4.0 km || 
|-id=439 bgcolor=#d6d6d6
| 403439 ||  || — || September 24, 2009 || Kitt Peak || Spacewatch || VER || align=right | 3.0 km || 
|-id=440 bgcolor=#d6d6d6
| 403440 ||  || — || September 16, 2009 || Kitt Peak || Spacewatch || — || align=right | 2.9 km || 
|-id=441 bgcolor=#d6d6d6
| 403441 ||  || — || September 20, 2009 || Mount Lemmon || Mount Lemmon Survey || LIX || align=right | 4.2 km || 
|-id=442 bgcolor=#d6d6d6
| 403442 ||  || — || September 17, 2009 || Catalina || CSS || — || align=right | 3.4 km || 
|-id=443 bgcolor=#d6d6d6
| 403443 ||  || — || September 16, 2009 || Catalina || CSS || — || align=right | 3.5 km || 
|-id=444 bgcolor=#d6d6d6
| 403444 ||  || — || September 17, 2009 || Kitt Peak || Spacewatch || — || align=right | 3.6 km || 
|-id=445 bgcolor=#d6d6d6
| 403445 ||  || — || July 28, 2009 || Kitt Peak || Spacewatch || — || align=right | 3.4 km || 
|-id=446 bgcolor=#d6d6d6
| 403446 ||  || — || September 24, 2009 || Kitt Peak || Spacewatch || THM || align=right | 2.5 km || 
|-id=447 bgcolor=#d6d6d6
| 403447 ||  || — || September 17, 2009 || Kitt Peak || Spacewatch || — || align=right | 3.3 km || 
|-id=448 bgcolor=#d6d6d6
| 403448 ||  || — || September 17, 2009 || Kitt Peak || Spacewatch || — || align=right | 3.3 km || 
|-id=449 bgcolor=#d6d6d6
| 403449 ||  || — || September 21, 2009 || Kitt Peak || Spacewatch || — || align=right | 3.1 km || 
|-id=450 bgcolor=#d6d6d6
| 403450 ||  || — || September 25, 2009 || Kitt Peak || Spacewatch || — || align=right | 3.0 km || 
|-id=451 bgcolor=#d6d6d6
| 403451 ||  || — || September 26, 2009 || Kitt Peak || Spacewatch || — || align=right | 2.6 km || 
|-id=452 bgcolor=#d6d6d6
| 403452 ||  || — || September 27, 2009 || Kitt Peak || Spacewatch || — || align=right | 2.8 km || 
|-id=453 bgcolor=#d6d6d6
| 403453 ||  || — || September 17, 2009 || Kitt Peak || Spacewatch || — || align=right | 2.3 km || 
|-id=454 bgcolor=#d6d6d6
| 403454 ||  || — || September 18, 2009 || Kitt Peak || Spacewatch || — || align=right | 3.5 km || 
|-id=455 bgcolor=#d6d6d6
| 403455 ||  || — || September 20, 2009 || Kitt Peak || Spacewatch || — || align=right | 2.7 km || 
|-id=456 bgcolor=#d6d6d6
| 403456 ||  || — || December 27, 2005 || Kitt Peak || Spacewatch || — || align=right | 3.5 km || 
|-id=457 bgcolor=#d6d6d6
| 403457 ||  || — || September 22, 2009 || Kitt Peak || Spacewatch || — || align=right | 3.6 km || 
|-id=458 bgcolor=#d6d6d6
| 403458 ||  || — || September 18, 2009 || Kitt Peak || Spacewatch || EOS || align=right | 2.2 km || 
|-id=459 bgcolor=#d6d6d6
| 403459 ||  || — || September 21, 2009 || Catalina || CSS || — || align=right | 3.5 km || 
|-id=460 bgcolor=#d6d6d6
| 403460 ||  || — || September 23, 2009 || Kitt Peak || Spacewatch || — || align=right | 2.3 km || 
|-id=461 bgcolor=#d6d6d6
| 403461 ||  || — || September 16, 2009 || Catalina || CSS || — || align=right | 2.4 km || 
|-id=462 bgcolor=#d6d6d6
| 403462 ||  || — || September 17, 2009 || Kitt Peak || Spacewatch || — || align=right | 3.5 km || 
|-id=463 bgcolor=#d6d6d6
| 403463 ||  || — || September 22, 2009 || Catalina || CSS || — || align=right | 2.8 km || 
|-id=464 bgcolor=#d6d6d6
| 403464 ||  || — || September 19, 2009 || Kitt Peak || Spacewatch || — || align=right | 2.2 km || 
|-id=465 bgcolor=#d6d6d6
| 403465 ||  || — || September 15, 2009 || Kitt Peak || Spacewatch || — || align=right | 3.2 km || 
|-id=466 bgcolor=#d6d6d6
| 403466 ||  || — || September 15, 2009 || Kitt Peak || Spacewatch || — || align=right | 2.7 km || 
|-id=467 bgcolor=#d6d6d6
| 403467 ||  || — || July 27, 2009 || Kitt Peak || Spacewatch || — || align=right | 3.5 km || 
|-id=468 bgcolor=#d6d6d6
| 403468 ||  || — || September 28, 2009 || Mount Lemmon || Mount Lemmon Survey || — || align=right | 3.1 km || 
|-id=469 bgcolor=#d6d6d6
| 403469 ||  || — || October 15, 2009 || Mayhill || A. Lowe || — || align=right | 3.5 km || 
|-id=470 bgcolor=#d6d6d6
| 403470 ||  || — || December 16, 1993 || Kitt Peak || Spacewatch || — || align=right | 4.2 km || 
|-id=471 bgcolor=#d6d6d6
| 403471 ||  || — || October 11, 2009 || Mount Lemmon || Mount Lemmon Survey || THM || align=right | 2.6 km || 
|-id=472 bgcolor=#d6d6d6
| 403472 ||  || — || September 16, 2009 || Catalina || CSS || TIR || align=right | 3.5 km || 
|-id=473 bgcolor=#d6d6d6
| 403473 ||  || — || October 9, 2009 || Catalina || CSS || — || align=right | 3.5 km || 
|-id=474 bgcolor=#d6d6d6
| 403474 ||  || — || October 10, 2009 || Catalina || CSS || EOS || align=right | 2.6 km || 
|-id=475 bgcolor=#d6d6d6
| 403475 ||  || — || October 12, 2009 || Mount Lemmon || Mount Lemmon Survey || — || align=right | 3.4 km || 
|-id=476 bgcolor=#d6d6d6
| 403476 ||  || — || October 14, 2009 || Mount Lemmon || Mount Lemmon Survey || — || align=right | 3.9 km || 
|-id=477 bgcolor=#d6d6d6
| 403477 ||  || — || January 26, 2006 || Catalina || CSS || — || align=right | 4.2 km || 
|-id=478 bgcolor=#d6d6d6
| 403478 ||  || — || October 16, 2009 || Catalina || CSS || — || align=right | 3.4 km || 
|-id=479 bgcolor=#d6d6d6
| 403479 ||  || — || October 2, 2009 || Mount Lemmon || Mount Lemmon Survey || — || align=right | 3.2 km || 
|-id=480 bgcolor=#d6d6d6
| 403480 ||  || — || October 16, 2009 || Mount Lemmon || Mount Lemmon Survey || — || align=right | 3.5 km || 
|-id=481 bgcolor=#d6d6d6
| 403481 ||  || — || September 19, 2009 || Mount Lemmon || Mount Lemmon Survey || — || align=right | 3.8 km || 
|-id=482 bgcolor=#d6d6d6
| 403482 ||  || — || October 18, 2009 || Mount Lemmon || Mount Lemmon Survey || THM || align=right | 3.2 km || 
|-id=483 bgcolor=#d6d6d6
| 403483 ||  || — || October 22, 2009 || Mount Lemmon || Mount Lemmon Survey || — || align=right | 2.2 km || 
|-id=484 bgcolor=#d6d6d6
| 403484 ||  || — || October 18, 2009 || Mount Lemmon || Mount Lemmon Survey || THM || align=right | 1.8 km || 
|-id=485 bgcolor=#d6d6d6
| 403485 ||  || — || October 23, 2009 || Mount Lemmon || Mount Lemmon Survey || — || align=right | 2.9 km || 
|-id=486 bgcolor=#d6d6d6
| 403486 ||  || — || October 23, 2009 || Mount Lemmon || Mount Lemmon Survey || — || align=right | 3.6 km || 
|-id=487 bgcolor=#d6d6d6
| 403487 ||  || — || October 17, 2009 || Mount Lemmon || Mount Lemmon Survey || — || align=right | 2.4 km || 
|-id=488 bgcolor=#d6d6d6
| 403488 ||  || — || October 22, 2009 || Catalina || CSS || — || align=right | 3.2 km || 
|-id=489 bgcolor=#d6d6d6
| 403489 ||  || — || May 3, 2008 || Kitt Peak || Spacewatch || — || align=right | 2.1 km || 
|-id=490 bgcolor=#d6d6d6
| 403490 ||  || — || October 18, 2009 || Mount Lemmon || Mount Lemmon Survey || 3:2 || align=right | 6.7 km || 
|-id=491 bgcolor=#d6d6d6
| 403491 Anthonygrayling ||  ||  || October 21, 2009 || Catalina || CSS || — || align=right | 2.8 km || 
|-id=492 bgcolor=#d6d6d6
| 403492 ||  || — || October 24, 2009 || Catalina || CSS || — || align=right | 3.2 km || 
|-id=493 bgcolor=#d6d6d6
| 403493 ||  || — || October 26, 2009 || Nazaret || G. Muler || — || align=right | 3.5 km || 
|-id=494 bgcolor=#d6d6d6
| 403494 ||  || — || October 24, 2009 || Catalina || CSS || EOS || align=right | 2.3 km || 
|-id=495 bgcolor=#d6d6d6
| 403495 ||  || — || October 23, 2009 || Mount Lemmon || Mount Lemmon Survey || — || align=right | 2.9 km || 
|-id=496 bgcolor=#d6d6d6
| 403496 ||  || — || October 16, 2009 || Catalina || CSS || — || align=right | 2.9 km || 
|-id=497 bgcolor=#d6d6d6
| 403497 ||  || — || October 17, 2009 || Catalina || CSS || TIR || align=right | 3.3 km || 
|-id=498 bgcolor=#d6d6d6
| 403498 ||  || — || October 27, 2009 || La Sagra || OAM Obs. || LIX || align=right | 4.0 km || 
|-id=499 bgcolor=#d6d6d6
| 403499 ||  || — || October 24, 2009 || Kitt Peak || Spacewatch || — || align=right | 2.4 km || 
|-id=500 bgcolor=#d6d6d6
| 403500 ||  || — || October 24, 2009 || Kitt Peak || Spacewatch || — || align=right | 2.5 km || 
|}

403501–403600 

|-bgcolor=#d6d6d6
| 403501 ||  || — || November 9, 2009 || Mount Lemmon || Mount Lemmon Survey || — || align=right | 2.5 km || 
|-id=502 bgcolor=#d6d6d6
| 403502 ||  || — || November 8, 2009 || Kitt Peak || Spacewatch || — || align=right | 2.3 km || 
|-id=503 bgcolor=#d6d6d6
| 403503 ||  || — || November 9, 2009 || Socorro || LINEAR || — || align=right | 2.4 km || 
|-id=504 bgcolor=#d6d6d6
| 403504 ||  || — || November 8, 2009 || Kitt Peak || Spacewatch || THM || align=right | 2.2 km || 
|-id=505 bgcolor=#d6d6d6
| 403505 ||  || — || September 22, 2009 || Catalina || CSS || — || align=right | 4.5 km || 
|-id=506 bgcolor=#d6d6d6
| 403506 ||  || — || November 9, 2009 || Kitt Peak || Spacewatch || — || align=right | 3.8 km || 
|-id=507 bgcolor=#d6d6d6
| 403507 ||  || — || November 9, 2009 || Catalina || CSS || — || align=right | 3.4 km || 
|-id=508 bgcolor=#d6d6d6
| 403508 ||  || — || October 1, 2009 || Mount Lemmon || Mount Lemmon Survey || TIR || align=right | 3.4 km || 
|-id=509 bgcolor=#d6d6d6
| 403509 ||  || — || November 17, 2009 || Vail-Jarnac || Jarnac Obs. || — || align=right | 2.3 km || 
|-id=510 bgcolor=#d6d6d6
| 403510 ||  || — || October 24, 2009 || Catalina || CSS || — || align=right | 4.1 km || 
|-id=511 bgcolor=#E9E9E9
| 403511 ||  || — || January 23, 2006 || Mount Lemmon || Mount Lemmon Survey || — || align=right | 2.0 km || 
|-id=512 bgcolor=#d6d6d6
| 403512 ||  || — || November 20, 2009 || Kitt Peak || Spacewatch || THM || align=right | 2.0 km || 
|-id=513 bgcolor=#d6d6d6
| 403513 ||  || — || November 14, 1998 || Kitt Peak || Spacewatch || THM || align=right | 2.0 km || 
|-id=514 bgcolor=#d6d6d6
| 403514 ||  || — || September 22, 2009 || Mount Lemmon || Mount Lemmon Survey || THM || align=right | 2.4 km || 
|-id=515 bgcolor=#d6d6d6
| 403515 ||  || — || December 15, 2009 || Mount Lemmon || Mount Lemmon Survey || 3:2 || align=right | 4.7 km || 
|-id=516 bgcolor=#d6d6d6
| 403516 ||  || — || January 8, 2010 || Catalina || CSS || Tj (2.93) || align=right | 4.9 km || 
|-id=517 bgcolor=#fefefe
| 403517 ||  || — || January 6, 2010 || Bisei SG Center || BATTeRS || — || align=right | 1.00 km || 
|-id=518 bgcolor=#d6d6d6
| 403518 ||  || — || September 28, 2009 || Mount Lemmon || Mount Lemmon Survey || — || align=right | 2.9 km || 
|-id=519 bgcolor=#fefefe
| 403519 ||  || — || September 19, 2003 || Kitt Peak || Spacewatch || — || align=right | 2.3 km || 
|-id=520 bgcolor=#fefefe
| 403520 ||  || — || February 6, 2010 || WISE || WISE || — || align=right | 1.8 km || 
|-id=521 bgcolor=#d6d6d6
| 403521 ||  || — || February 13, 2010 || Mount Lemmon || Mount Lemmon Survey || 3:2 || align=right | 5.0 km || 
|-id=522 bgcolor=#d6d6d6
| 403522 ||  || — || February 14, 2010 || Mount Lemmon || Mount Lemmon Survey || 3:2 || align=right | 5.6 km || 
|-id=523 bgcolor=#fefefe
| 403523 ||  || — || February 14, 2010 || Mount Lemmon || Mount Lemmon Survey || — || align=right | 1.00 km || 
|-id=524 bgcolor=#fefefe
| 403524 ||  || — || April 5, 2003 || Kitt Peak || Spacewatch || MAS || align=right data-sort-value="0.77" | 770 m || 
|-id=525 bgcolor=#fefefe
| 403525 ||  || — || February 17, 2010 || Kitt Peak || Spacewatch || — || align=right data-sort-value="0.90" | 900 m || 
|-id=526 bgcolor=#fefefe
| 403526 ||  || — || February 13, 2010 || Kitt Peak || Spacewatch || — || align=right | 1.2 km || 
|-id=527 bgcolor=#fefefe
| 403527 ||  || — || April 8, 2003 || Kitt Peak || Spacewatch || V || align=right data-sort-value="0.71" | 710 m || 
|-id=528 bgcolor=#fefefe
| 403528 ||  || — || September 28, 1992 || Kitt Peak || Spacewatch || — || align=right data-sort-value="0.89" | 890 m || 
|-id=529 bgcolor=#fefefe
| 403529 ||  || — || March 13, 2010 || Catalina || CSS || — || align=right | 1.0 km || 
|-id=530 bgcolor=#fefefe
| 403530 ||  || — || October 28, 2008 || Kitt Peak || Spacewatch || — || align=right data-sort-value="0.72" | 720 m || 
|-id=531 bgcolor=#fefefe
| 403531 ||  || — || March 16, 2010 || Mount Lemmon || Mount Lemmon Survey || — || align=right | 1.9 km || 
|-id=532 bgcolor=#fefefe
| 403532 ||  || — || March 22, 2010 || ESA OGS || ESA OGS || — || align=right data-sort-value="0.71" | 710 m || 
|-id=533 bgcolor=#fefefe
| 403533 ||  || — || March 17, 2010 || Kitt Peak || Spacewatch || — || align=right data-sort-value="0.71" | 710 m || 
|-id=534 bgcolor=#fefefe
| 403534 ||  || — || April 26, 2003 || Kitt Peak || Spacewatch || — || align=right data-sort-value="0.68" | 680 m || 
|-id=535 bgcolor=#fefefe
| 403535 ||  || — || November 8, 2008 || Kitt Peak || Spacewatch || — || align=right data-sort-value="0.82" | 820 m || 
|-id=536 bgcolor=#fefefe
| 403536 ||  || — || October 3, 2008 || Mount Lemmon || Mount Lemmon Survey || — || align=right data-sort-value="0.60" | 600 m || 
|-id=537 bgcolor=#fefefe
| 403537 ||  || — || April 10, 2010 || Kitt Peak || Spacewatch || — || align=right data-sort-value="0.76" | 760 m || 
|-id=538 bgcolor=#fefefe
| 403538 ||  || — || April 11, 2010 || Kitt Peak || Spacewatch || (2076) || align=right data-sort-value="0.71" | 710 m || 
|-id=539 bgcolor=#fefefe
| 403539 ||  || — || April 8, 2010 || Kitt Peak || Spacewatch || — || align=right data-sort-value="0.75" | 750 m || 
|-id=540 bgcolor=#fefefe
| 403540 ||  || — || March 13, 2010 || Mount Lemmon || Mount Lemmon Survey || — || align=right data-sort-value="0.85" | 850 m || 
|-id=541 bgcolor=#fefefe
| 403541 ||  || — || December 1, 2005 || Kitt Peak || Spacewatch || — || align=right data-sort-value="0.71" | 710 m || 
|-id=542 bgcolor=#fefefe
| 403542 ||  || — || April 17, 2010 || WISE || WISE || — || align=right | 1.8 km || 
|-id=543 bgcolor=#fefefe
| 403543 ||  || — || April 18, 2010 || WISE || WISE || — || align=right | 2.1 km || 
|-id=544 bgcolor=#fefefe
| 403544 ||  || — || April 25, 2010 || Mount Lemmon || Mount Lemmon Survey || — || align=right | 1.3 km || 
|-id=545 bgcolor=#fefefe
| 403545 ||  || — || April 26, 2010 || Mount Lemmon || Mount Lemmon Survey || — || align=right data-sort-value="0.82" | 820 m || 
|-id=546 bgcolor=#fefefe
| 403546 ||  || — || April 30, 2010 || WISE || WISE || — || align=right | 1.9 km || 
|-id=547 bgcolor=#fefefe
| 403547 ||  || — || April 16, 2010 || Siding Spring || SSS || — || align=right | 1.0 km || 
|-id=548 bgcolor=#fefefe
| 403548 ||  || — || January 23, 2006 || Mount Lemmon || Mount Lemmon Survey || PHO || align=right data-sort-value="0.94" | 940 m || 
|-id=549 bgcolor=#fefefe
| 403549 || 2010 JJ || — || May 3, 2010 || Nogales || Tenagra II Obs. || — || align=right data-sort-value="0.96" | 960 m || 
|-id=550 bgcolor=#fefefe
| 403550 ||  || — || May 3, 2010 || Kitt Peak || Spacewatch || NYS || align=right data-sort-value="0.62" | 620 m || 
|-id=551 bgcolor=#E9E9E9
| 403551 ||  || — || May 9, 2010 || WISE || WISE || — || align=right | 2.4 km || 
|-id=552 bgcolor=#fefefe
| 403552 ||  || — || May 5, 2010 || Mount Lemmon || Mount Lemmon Survey || — || align=right | 1.2 km || 
|-id=553 bgcolor=#fefefe
| 403553 ||  || — || January 9, 2006 || Kitt Peak || Spacewatch || — || align=right data-sort-value="0.81" | 810 m || 
|-id=554 bgcolor=#fefefe
| 403554 ||  || — || May 11, 2010 || Mount Lemmon || Mount Lemmon Survey || MAS || align=right data-sort-value="0.65" | 650 m || 
|-id=555 bgcolor=#fefefe
| 403555 ||  || — || May 12, 2010 || Mount Lemmon || Mount Lemmon Survey || — || align=right data-sort-value="0.75" | 750 m || 
|-id=556 bgcolor=#E9E9E9
| 403556 ||  || — || May 22, 2010 || WISE || WISE || — || align=right | 3.3 km || 
|-id=557 bgcolor=#E9E9E9
| 403557 ||  || — || May 27, 2010 || WISE || WISE || KONcritical || align=right | 1.8 km || 
|-id=558 bgcolor=#E9E9E9
| 403558 ||  || — || June 1, 2010 || WISE || WISE || (1547) || align=right | 2.2 km || 
|-id=559 bgcolor=#fefefe
| 403559 ||  || — || September 5, 2007 || Catalina || CSS || — || align=right | 1.00 km || 
|-id=560 bgcolor=#E9E9E9
| 403560 ||  || — || July 21, 2006 || Mount Lemmon || Mount Lemmon Survey || — || align=right | 1.8 km || 
|-id=561 bgcolor=#fefefe
| 403561 ||  || — || March 31, 2009 || Kitt Peak || Spacewatch || — || align=right | 2.8 km || 
|-id=562 bgcolor=#E9E9E9
| 403562 ||  || — || November 16, 2006 || Catalina || CSS || — || align=right | 3.1 km || 
|-id=563 bgcolor=#E9E9E9
| 403563 Ledbetter ||  ||  || June 13, 2010 || WISE || WISE || — || align=right | 2.5 km || 
|-id=564 bgcolor=#E9E9E9
| 403564 ||  || — || June 21, 2010 || WISE || WISE || — || align=right | 2.7 km || 
|-id=565 bgcolor=#E9E9E9
| 403565 ||  || — || June 24, 2010 || WISE || WISE || — || align=right | 2.8 km || 
|-id=566 bgcolor=#E9E9E9
| 403566 ||  || — || October 16, 2006 || Kitt Peak || Spacewatch || — || align=right | 1.9 km || 
|-id=567 bgcolor=#E9E9E9
| 403567 ||  || — || January 18, 2008 || Mount Lemmon || Mount Lemmon Survey || EUN || align=right | 1.5 km || 
|-id=568 bgcolor=#fefefe
| 403568 ||  || — || July 6, 2010 || Kitt Peak || Spacewatch || V || align=right data-sort-value="0.88" | 880 m || 
|-id=569 bgcolor=#E9E9E9
| 403569 ||  || — || November 13, 2006 || Mount Lemmon || Mount Lemmon Survey || — || align=right | 1.6 km || 
|-id=570 bgcolor=#E9E9E9
| 403570 ||  || — || July 9, 2010 || WISE || WISE || — || align=right | 1.9 km || 
|-id=571 bgcolor=#E9E9E9
| 403571 ||  || — || November 18, 2001 || Kitt Peak || Spacewatch || — || align=right | 2.4 km || 
|-id=572 bgcolor=#E9E9E9
| 403572 ||  || — || November 17, 2006 || Kitt Peak || Spacewatch || — || align=right | 1.9 km || 
|-id=573 bgcolor=#E9E9E9
| 403573 ||  || — || November 25, 2006 || Kitt Peak || Spacewatch || — || align=right | 3.4 km || 
|-id=574 bgcolor=#E9E9E9
| 403574 ||  || — || July 11, 2010 || WISE || WISE || — || align=right | 2.7 km || 
|-id=575 bgcolor=#E9E9E9
| 403575 ||  || — || September 19, 2001 || Socorro || LINEAR || — || align=right | 2.4 km || 
|-id=576 bgcolor=#E9E9E9
| 403576 ||  || — || March 5, 2008 || Mount Lemmon || Mount Lemmon Survey || — || align=right | 2.2 km || 
|-id=577 bgcolor=#E9E9E9
| 403577 ||  || — || July 14, 2010 || WISE || WISE || HOF || align=right | 2.2 km || 
|-id=578 bgcolor=#E9E9E9
| 403578 ||  || — || February 28, 2008 || Kitt Peak || Spacewatch || — || align=right | 2.6 km || 
|-id=579 bgcolor=#E9E9E9
| 403579 ||  || — || December 26, 2006 || Catalina || CSS || — || align=right | 2.9 km || 
|-id=580 bgcolor=#E9E9E9
| 403580 ||  || — || July 20, 2010 || WISE || WISE || — || align=right | 2.6 km || 
|-id=581 bgcolor=#E9E9E9
| 403581 ||  || — || September 8, 2001 || Socorro || LINEAR || — || align=right | 1.6 km || 
|-id=582 bgcolor=#E9E9E9
| 403582 ||  || — || July 24, 2010 || WISE || WISE || BRG || align=right | 1.8 km || 
|-id=583 bgcolor=#E9E9E9
| 403583 ||  || — || December 9, 2001 || Socorro || LINEAR || — || align=right | 2.1 km || 
|-id=584 bgcolor=#E9E9E9
| 403584 ||  || — || September 13, 2005 || Kitt Peak || Spacewatch || — || align=right | 2.7 km || 
|-id=585 bgcolor=#E9E9E9
| 403585 ||  || — || September 16, 2006 || Catalina || CSS || — || align=right | 1.1 km || 
|-id=586 bgcolor=#E9E9E9
| 403586 ||  || — || March 19, 2005 || Siding Spring || SSS || EUN || align=right | 1.7 km || 
|-id=587 bgcolor=#E9E9E9
| 403587 ||  || — || August 3, 2010 || Kitt Peak || Spacewatch || — || align=right data-sort-value="0.98" | 980 m || 
|-id=588 bgcolor=#E9E9E9
| 403588 ||  || — || December 17, 2001 || Socorro || LINEAR || TIN || align=right | 1.9 km || 
|-id=589 bgcolor=#E9E9E9
| 403589 ||  || — || January 26, 2003 || Kitt Peak || Spacewatch || — || align=right | 1.3 km || 
|-id=590 bgcolor=#E9E9E9
| 403590 ||  || — || December 13, 2006 || Kitt Peak || Spacewatch || — || align=right | 2.3 km || 
|-id=591 bgcolor=#fefefe
| 403591 ||  || — || June 19, 2010 || Mount Lemmon || Mount Lemmon Survey || — || align=right data-sort-value="0.84" | 840 m || 
|-id=592 bgcolor=#fefefe
| 403592 ||  || — || June 21, 2010 || Mount Lemmon || Mount Lemmon Survey || — || align=right data-sort-value="0.91" | 910 m || 
|-id=593 bgcolor=#E9E9E9
| 403593 ||  || — || August 13, 2010 || Kitt Peak || Spacewatch || — || align=right data-sort-value="0.99" | 990 m || 
|-id=594 bgcolor=#E9E9E9
| 403594 ||  || — || September 28, 2006 || Kitt Peak || Spacewatch || — || align=right | 1.6 km || 
|-id=595 bgcolor=#fefefe
| 403595 ||  || — || August 21, 2010 || Siding Spring || SSS || — || align=right | 1.2 km || 
|-id=596 bgcolor=#E9E9E9
| 403596 ||  || — || October 16, 2006 || Kitt Peak || Spacewatch || — || align=right | 1.7 km || 
|-id=597 bgcolor=#E9E9E9
| 403597 ||  || — || October 2, 2006 || Mount Lemmon || Mount Lemmon Survey || — || align=right | 1.8 km || 
|-id=598 bgcolor=#E9E9E9
| 403598 ||  || — || September 2, 2010 || Mount Lemmon || Mount Lemmon Survey || — || align=right data-sort-value="0.98" | 980 m || 
|-id=599 bgcolor=#E9E9E9
| 403599 ||  || — || January 10, 2008 || Kitt Peak || Spacewatch || — || align=right | 1.4 km || 
|-id=600 bgcolor=#E9E9E9
| 403600 ||  || — || September 2, 2010 || Mount Lemmon || Mount Lemmon Survey || MRX || align=right | 1.2 km || 
|}

403601–403700 

|-bgcolor=#E9E9E9
| 403601 ||  || — || September 17, 2006 || Catalina || CSS || EUN || align=right | 1.1 km || 
|-id=602 bgcolor=#E9E9E9
| 403602 ||  || — || September 4, 2010 || Mount Lemmon || Mount Lemmon Survey || — || align=right | 1.6 km || 
|-id=603 bgcolor=#E9E9E9
| 403603 ||  || — || September 16, 2006 || Catalina || CSS || — || align=right | 1.4 km || 
|-id=604 bgcolor=#E9E9E9
| 403604 ||  || — || January 5, 2003 || Anderson Mesa || LONEOS || — || align=right | 2.2 km || 
|-id=605 bgcolor=#E9E9E9
| 403605 ||  || — || March 16, 2004 || Kitt Peak || Spacewatch || GAL || align=right | 1.7 km || 
|-id=606 bgcolor=#d6d6d6
| 403606 ||  || — || September 4, 2010 || Kitt Peak || Spacewatch || — || align=right | 2.7 km || 
|-id=607 bgcolor=#E9E9E9
| 403607 ||  || — || August 30, 2005 || Kitt Peak || Spacewatch || — || align=right | 2.2 km || 
|-id=608 bgcolor=#E9E9E9
| 403608 ||  || — || September 4, 2010 || Kitt Peak || Spacewatch || — || align=right | 1.4 km || 
|-id=609 bgcolor=#E9E9E9
| 403609 ||  || — || December 18, 2007 || Mount Lemmon || Mount Lemmon Survey || — || align=right | 1.7 km || 
|-id=610 bgcolor=#E9E9E9
| 403610 ||  || — || September 6, 2010 || Kitt Peak || Spacewatch || — || align=right | 1.5 km || 
|-id=611 bgcolor=#E9E9E9
| 403611 ||  || — || February 10, 2008 || Kitt Peak || Spacewatch || — || align=right | 1.5 km || 
|-id=612 bgcolor=#E9E9E9
| 403612 ||  || — || September 30, 2006 || Mount Lemmon || Mount Lemmon Survey || — || align=right | 1.4 km || 
|-id=613 bgcolor=#E9E9E9
| 403613 ||  || — || October 20, 2006 || Kitt Peak || Spacewatch || — || align=right | 1.4 km || 
|-id=614 bgcolor=#E9E9E9
| 403614 ||  || — || September 10, 2010 || Kitt Peak || Spacewatch || — || align=right | 2.1 km || 
|-id=615 bgcolor=#d6d6d6
| 403615 ||  || — || September 10, 2010 || Kitt Peak || Spacewatch || TRE || align=right | 2.2 km || 
|-id=616 bgcolor=#E9E9E9
| 403616 ||  || — || September 19, 2001 || Socorro || LINEAR || — || align=right | 1.3 km || 
|-id=617 bgcolor=#E9E9E9
| 403617 ||  || — || March 28, 2008 || Mount Lemmon || Mount Lemmon Survey || — || align=right | 1.6 km || 
|-id=618 bgcolor=#E9E9E9
| 403618 ||  || — || October 4, 2006 || Mount Lemmon || Mount Lemmon Survey || — || align=right | 1.5 km || 
|-id=619 bgcolor=#E9E9E9
| 403619 ||  || — || September 11, 2010 || Kitt Peak || Spacewatch || — || align=right | 1.6 km || 
|-id=620 bgcolor=#E9E9E9
| 403620 ||  || — || November 19, 2006 || Kitt Peak || Spacewatch || HOF || align=right | 1.9 km || 
|-id=621 bgcolor=#E9E9E9
| 403621 ||  || — || October 16, 2006 || Kitt Peak || Spacewatch || — || align=right data-sort-value="0.96" | 960 m || 
|-id=622 bgcolor=#E9E9E9
| 403622 ||  || — || September 14, 2010 || Kitt Peak || Spacewatch || — || align=right | 2.1 km || 
|-id=623 bgcolor=#E9E9E9
| 403623 ||  || — || February 8, 2008 || Kitt Peak || Spacewatch || — || align=right | 2.6 km || 
|-id=624 bgcolor=#E9E9E9
| 403624 ||  || — || September 24, 2006 || Anderson Mesa || LONEOS || — || align=right | 1.2 km || 
|-id=625 bgcolor=#E9E9E9
| 403625 ||  || — || October 28, 2006 || Mount Lemmon || Mount Lemmon Survey || — || align=right | 1.7 km || 
|-id=626 bgcolor=#E9E9E9
| 403626 ||  || — || September 25, 2006 || Kitt Peak || Spacewatch || EUN || align=right data-sort-value="0.96" | 960 m || 
|-id=627 bgcolor=#E9E9E9
| 403627 ||  || — || September 8, 2010 || Kitt Peak || Spacewatch || — || align=right | 2.2 km || 
|-id=628 bgcolor=#E9E9E9
| 403628 ||  || — || November 15, 2006 || Catalina || CSS || — || align=right | 1.6 km || 
|-id=629 bgcolor=#E9E9E9
| 403629 ||  || — || February 14, 2004 || Kitt Peak || Spacewatch || — || align=right | 1.7 km || 
|-id=630 bgcolor=#d6d6d6
| 403630 ||  || — || October 1, 2005 || Mount Lemmon || Mount Lemmon Survey || — || align=right | 2.6 km || 
|-id=631 bgcolor=#d6d6d6
| 403631 ||  || — || September 16, 2010 || Mount Lemmon || Mount Lemmon Survey || EOS || align=right | 2.3 km || 
|-id=632 bgcolor=#E9E9E9
| 403632 ||  || — || October 3, 2006 || Mount Lemmon || Mount Lemmon Survey || — || align=right | 1.4 km || 
|-id=633 bgcolor=#E9E9E9
| 403633 ||  || — || March 28, 2008 || Mount Lemmon || Mount Lemmon Survey || — || align=right | 1.6 km || 
|-id=634 bgcolor=#E9E9E9
| 403634 ||  || — || September 2, 2010 || Mount Lemmon || Mount Lemmon Survey || — || align=right | 1.1 km || 
|-id=635 bgcolor=#E9E9E9
| 403635 ||  || — || November 22, 2006 || Mount Lemmon || Mount Lemmon Survey || — || align=right | 1.9 km || 
|-id=636 bgcolor=#E9E9E9
| 403636 ||  || — || September 10, 2010 || Kitt Peak || Spacewatch || — || align=right | 2.2 km || 
|-id=637 bgcolor=#E9E9E9
| 403637 ||  || — || September 20, 2001 || Kitt Peak || Spacewatch ||  || align=right | 1.6 km || 
|-id=638 bgcolor=#fefefe
| 403638 ||  || — || September 29, 2010 || Catalina || CSS || — || align=right | 1.1 km || 
|-id=639 bgcolor=#E9E9E9
| 403639 ||  || — || March 31, 2009 || Kitt Peak || Spacewatch || MIS || align=right | 2.3 km || 
|-id=640 bgcolor=#E9E9E9
| 403640 ||  || — || September 19, 2010 || Kitt Peak || Spacewatch || HOF || align=right | 1.8 km || 
|-id=641 bgcolor=#d6d6d6
| 403641 ||  || — || September 13, 2005 || Kitt Peak || Spacewatch || — || align=right | 1.9 km || 
|-id=642 bgcolor=#E9E9E9
| 403642 ||  || — || March 28, 2009 || Kitt Peak || Spacewatch || EUN || align=right | 1.2 km || 
|-id=643 bgcolor=#E9E9E9
| 403643 ||  || — || December 27, 2006 || Mount Lemmon || Mount Lemmon Survey || — || align=right | 2.2 km || 
|-id=644 bgcolor=#E9E9E9
| 403644 ||  || — || September 14, 2010 || Kitt Peak || Spacewatch || PAD || align=right | 1.7 km || 
|-id=645 bgcolor=#E9E9E9
| 403645 ||  || — || September 14, 2010 || Kitt Peak || Spacewatch || — || align=right | 1.8 km || 
|-id=646 bgcolor=#E9E9E9
| 403646 ||  || — || September 1, 2005 || Kitt Peak || Spacewatch || — || align=right | 2.2 km || 
|-id=647 bgcolor=#E9E9E9
| 403647 ||  || — || October 8, 2010 || Kitt Peak || Spacewatch || AEO || align=right | 1.2 km || 
|-id=648 bgcolor=#E9E9E9
| 403648 ||  || — || November 22, 2006 || Kitt Peak || Spacewatch || — || align=right | 1.9 km || 
|-id=649 bgcolor=#E9E9E9
| 403649 ||  || — || October 4, 2006 || Mount Lemmon || Mount Lemmon Survey || KON || align=right | 3.1 km || 
|-id=650 bgcolor=#E9E9E9
| 403650 ||  || — || September 12, 2001 || Socorro || LINEAR || — || align=right | 1.8 km || 
|-id=651 bgcolor=#E9E9E9
| 403651 ||  || — || September 17, 2010 || Kitt Peak || Spacewatch || — || align=right | 1.8 km || 
|-id=652 bgcolor=#E9E9E9
| 403652 ||  || — || May 20, 2004 || Kitt Peak || Spacewatch || AST || align=right | 1.9 km || 
|-id=653 bgcolor=#E9E9E9
| 403653 ||  || — || August 12, 2010 || Kitt Peak || Spacewatch || — || align=right | 1.6 km || 
|-id=654 bgcolor=#E9E9E9
| 403654 ||  || — || February 9, 2008 || Mount Lemmon || Mount Lemmon Survey || — || align=right | 1.3 km || 
|-id=655 bgcolor=#E9E9E9
| 403655 ||  || — || September 30, 2010 || Mount Lemmon || Mount Lemmon Survey || — || align=right | 1.7 km || 
|-id=656 bgcolor=#E9E9E9
| 403656 ||  || — || September 2, 2010 || Mount Lemmon || Mount Lemmon Survey || — || align=right | 2.9 km || 
|-id=657 bgcolor=#E9E9E9
| 403657 ||  || — || October 23, 2006 || Catalina || CSS || — || align=right | 2.0 km || 
|-id=658 bgcolor=#E9E9E9
| 403658 ||  || — || October 17, 2006 || Mount Lemmon || Mount Lemmon Survey || — || align=right | 1.3 km || 
|-id=659 bgcolor=#d6d6d6
| 403659 ||  || — || March 14, 2008 || Catalina || CSS || — || align=right | 2.3 km || 
|-id=660 bgcolor=#E9E9E9
| 403660 ||  || — || February 28, 2008 || Mount Lemmon || Mount Lemmon Survey || — || align=right | 2.2 km || 
|-id=661 bgcolor=#E9E9E9
| 403661 ||  || — || March 8, 2008 || Mount Lemmon || Mount Lemmon Survey || — || align=right | 2.1 km || 
|-id=662 bgcolor=#E9E9E9
| 403662 ||  || — || October 1, 2010 || Kitt Peak || Spacewatch || AST || align=right | 1.6 km || 
|-id=663 bgcolor=#E9E9E9
| 403663 ||  || — || September 4, 2010 || Kitt Peak || Spacewatch || AGN || align=right | 1.1 km || 
|-id=664 bgcolor=#E9E9E9
| 403664 ||  || — || July 10, 2010 || WISE || WISE || — || align=right | 1.7 km || 
|-id=665 bgcolor=#E9E9E9
| 403665 ||  || — || October 18, 2006 || Kitt Peak || Spacewatch || — || align=right data-sort-value="0.90" | 900 m || 
|-id=666 bgcolor=#d6d6d6
| 403666 ||  || — || October 27, 2005 || Kitt Peak || Spacewatch || — || align=right | 2.8 km || 
|-id=667 bgcolor=#E9E9E9
| 403667 ||  || — || September 26, 2006 || Catalina || CSS || — || align=right | 1.1 km || 
|-id=668 bgcolor=#E9E9E9
| 403668 ||  || — || June 5, 2005 || Kitt Peak || Spacewatch || — || align=right | 1.8 km || 
|-id=669 bgcolor=#E9E9E9
| 403669 ||  || — || September 16, 2010 || Kitt Peak || Spacewatch || — || align=right | 2.1 km || 
|-id=670 bgcolor=#E9E9E9
| 403670 ||  || — || December 15, 2006 || Kitt Peak || Spacewatch || — || align=right | 1.7 km || 
|-id=671 bgcolor=#E9E9E9
| 403671 ||  || — || February 14, 1999 || Kitt Peak || Spacewatch || — || align=right | 1.4 km || 
|-id=672 bgcolor=#E9E9E9
| 403672 ||  || — || November 20, 2006 || Kitt Peak || Spacewatch || — || align=right | 1.6 km || 
|-id=673 bgcolor=#E9E9E9
| 403673 ||  || — || October 16, 2001 || Kitt Peak || Spacewatch || — || align=right | 2.1 km || 
|-id=674 bgcolor=#d6d6d6
| 403674 ||  || — || November 29, 2005 || Kitt Peak || Spacewatch || — || align=right | 2.8 km || 
|-id=675 bgcolor=#d6d6d6
| 403675 ||  || — || October 28, 2010 || Kitt Peak || Spacewatch || KOR || align=right | 1.5 km || 
|-id=676 bgcolor=#E9E9E9
| 403676 ||  || — || December 13, 2006 || Mount Lemmon || Mount Lemmon Survey || — || align=right | 1.3 km || 
|-id=677 bgcolor=#d6d6d6
| 403677 ||  || — || October 13, 2010 || Mount Lemmon || Mount Lemmon Survey || — || align=right | 2.7 km || 
|-id=678 bgcolor=#d6d6d6
| 403678 ||  || — || January 17, 2007 || Catalina || CSS || — || align=right | 3.2 km || 
|-id=679 bgcolor=#E9E9E9
| 403679 ||  || — || September 20, 2001 || Socorro || LINEAR || — || align=right | 1.4 km || 
|-id=680 bgcolor=#d6d6d6
| 403680 ||  || — || October 14, 2010 || Mount Lemmon || Mount Lemmon Survey || — || align=right | 3.6 km || 
|-id=681 bgcolor=#E9E9E9
| 403681 ||  || — || October 19, 2010 || Mount Lemmon || Mount Lemmon Survey || HOF || align=right | 2.4 km || 
|-id=682 bgcolor=#E9E9E9
| 403682 ||  || — || August 30, 2005 || Kitt Peak || Spacewatch || GEF || align=right | 1.1 km || 
|-id=683 bgcolor=#E9E9E9
| 403683 ||  || — || December 17, 2006 || Catalina || CSS || — || align=right | 1.7 km || 
|-id=684 bgcolor=#E9E9E9
| 403684 ||  || — || October 11, 2010 || Mount Lemmon || Mount Lemmon Survey || MRX || align=right | 1.0 km || 
|-id=685 bgcolor=#d6d6d6
| 403685 ||  || — || November 2, 2010 || Kitt Peak || Spacewatch || — || align=right | 3.0 km || 
|-id=686 bgcolor=#d6d6d6
| 403686 ||  || — || October 30, 2005 || Kitt Peak || Spacewatch || KOR || align=right | 1.4 km || 
|-id=687 bgcolor=#d6d6d6
| 403687 ||  || — || April 5, 2008 || Mount Lemmon || Mount Lemmon Survey || — || align=right | 2.3 km || 
|-id=688 bgcolor=#d6d6d6
| 403688 ||  || — || October 30, 2010 || Kitt Peak || Spacewatch || EOS || align=right | 2.0 km || 
|-id=689 bgcolor=#E9E9E9
| 403689 ||  || — || November 16, 2006 || Mount Lemmon || Mount Lemmon Survey || — || align=right | 1.4 km || 
|-id=690 bgcolor=#d6d6d6
| 403690 ||  || — || November 1, 2010 || Kitt Peak || Spacewatch || EOS || align=right | 2.1 km || 
|-id=691 bgcolor=#E9E9E9
| 403691 ||  || — || November 29, 1997 || Kitt Peak || Spacewatch || — || align=right | 1.4 km || 
|-id=692 bgcolor=#E9E9E9
| 403692 ||  || — || April 11, 2008 || Mount Lemmon || Mount Lemmon Survey || PAD || align=right | 1.7 km || 
|-id=693 bgcolor=#E9E9E9
| 403693 ||  || — || March 4, 2008 || Kitt Peak || Spacewatch || — || align=right | 1.9 km || 
|-id=694 bgcolor=#d6d6d6
| 403694 ||  || — || September 30, 2005 || Mount Lemmon || Mount Lemmon Survey || KOR || align=right | 1.2 km || 
|-id=695 bgcolor=#d6d6d6
| 403695 ||  || — || September 10, 2004 || Socorro || LINEAR || — || align=right | 2.5 km || 
|-id=696 bgcolor=#d6d6d6
| 403696 ||  || — || October 31, 2005 || Mount Lemmon || Mount Lemmon Survey || KOR || align=right | 1.2 km || 
|-id=697 bgcolor=#d6d6d6
| 403697 ||  || — || December 1, 2005 || Mount Lemmon || Mount Lemmon Survey || KOR || align=right | 1.4 km || 
|-id=698 bgcolor=#d6d6d6
| 403698 ||  || — || November 30, 2005 || Kitt Peak || Spacewatch || — || align=right | 2.5 km || 
|-id=699 bgcolor=#d6d6d6
| 403699 ||  || — || March 19, 2007 || Mount Lemmon || Mount Lemmon Survey || — || align=right | 3.5 km || 
|-id=700 bgcolor=#d6d6d6
| 403700 ||  || — || October 17, 2010 || Mount Lemmon || Mount Lemmon Survey || — || align=right | 2.9 km || 
|}

403701–403800 

|-bgcolor=#d6d6d6
| 403701 ||  || — || February 22, 2007 || Kitt Peak || Spacewatch || — || align=right | 2.8 km || 
|-id=702 bgcolor=#d6d6d6
| 403702 ||  || — || November 6, 2010 || Mount Lemmon || Mount Lemmon Survey || — || align=right | 2.9 km || 
|-id=703 bgcolor=#d6d6d6
| 403703 ||  || — || November 8, 2010 || Kitt Peak || Spacewatch || — || align=right | 1.9 km || 
|-id=704 bgcolor=#d6d6d6
| 403704 ||  || — || December 30, 2005 || Kitt Peak || Spacewatch || — || align=right | 3.3 km || 
|-id=705 bgcolor=#d6d6d6
| 403705 ||  || — || November 24, 2006 || Mount Lemmon || Mount Lemmon Survey || KOR || align=right | 1.6 km || 
|-id=706 bgcolor=#d6d6d6
| 403706 ||  || — || November 10, 2010 || Mount Lemmon || Mount Lemmon Survey || — || align=right | 3.0 km || 
|-id=707 bgcolor=#d6d6d6
| 403707 ||  || — || November 10, 2010 || Mount Lemmon || Mount Lemmon Survey || — || align=right | 2.9 km || 
|-id=708 bgcolor=#d6d6d6
| 403708 ||  || — || January 27, 2007 || Mount Lemmon || Mount Lemmon Survey || KOR || align=right | 1.3 km || 
|-id=709 bgcolor=#d6d6d6
| 403709 ||  || — || December 28, 2005 || Kitt Peak || Spacewatch || — || align=right | 3.4 km || 
|-id=710 bgcolor=#E9E9E9
| 403710 ||  || — || October 10, 2010 || Mount Lemmon || Mount Lemmon Survey || — || align=right | 1.7 km || 
|-id=711 bgcolor=#E9E9E9
| 403711 ||  || — || January 29, 1995 || Kitt Peak || Spacewatch || — || align=right | 1.0 km || 
|-id=712 bgcolor=#E9E9E9
| 403712 ||  || — || February 8, 2008 || Kitt Peak || Spacewatch || — || align=right | 2.6 km || 
|-id=713 bgcolor=#E9E9E9
| 403713 ||  || — || September 14, 2005 || Kitt Peak || Spacewatch || PAD || align=right | 1.7 km || 
|-id=714 bgcolor=#d6d6d6
| 403714 ||  || — || September 20, 1995 || Kitt Peak || Spacewatch || KOR || align=right | 1.2 km || 
|-id=715 bgcolor=#E9E9E9
| 403715 ||  || — || April 12, 2004 || Kitt Peak || Spacewatch || AEO || align=right | 1.4 km || 
|-id=716 bgcolor=#E9E9E9
| 403716 ||  || — || August 29, 2005 || Kitt Peak || Spacewatch || — || align=right | 1.7 km || 
|-id=717 bgcolor=#E9E9E9
| 403717 ||  || — || November 20, 2006 || Kitt Peak || Spacewatch || — || align=right | 1.4 km || 
|-id=718 bgcolor=#d6d6d6
| 403718 ||  || — || March 12, 2007 || Kitt Peak || Spacewatch || EOS || align=right | 2.0 km || 
|-id=719 bgcolor=#d6d6d6
| 403719 ||  || — || October 30, 2010 || Mount Lemmon || Mount Lemmon Survey || — || align=right | 3.1 km || 
|-id=720 bgcolor=#d6d6d6
| 403720 ||  || — || November 1, 2005 || Mount Lemmon || Mount Lemmon Survey || KOR || align=right | 1.4 km || 
|-id=721 bgcolor=#d6d6d6
| 403721 ||  || — || November 12, 2005 || Kitt Peak || Spacewatch || KOR || align=right | 1.4 km || 
|-id=722 bgcolor=#d6d6d6
| 403722 ||  || — || September 10, 2004 || Kitt Peak || Spacewatch || — || align=right | 2.2 km || 
|-id=723 bgcolor=#d6d6d6
| 403723 ||  || — || October 29, 2005 || Mount Lemmon || Mount Lemmon Survey || — || align=right | 2.7 km || 
|-id=724 bgcolor=#d6d6d6
| 403724 ||  || — || November 14, 1999 || Socorro || LINEAR || — || align=right | 2.7 km || 
|-id=725 bgcolor=#E9E9E9
| 403725 ||  || — || June 11, 2004 || Kitt Peak || Spacewatch || — || align=right | 2.3 km || 
|-id=726 bgcolor=#d6d6d6
| 403726 ||  || — || November 13, 2010 || Kitt Peak || Spacewatch || — || align=right | 2.6 km || 
|-id=727 bgcolor=#d6d6d6
| 403727 ||  || — || November 3, 2010 || Kitt Peak || Spacewatch || — || align=right | 2.5 km || 
|-id=728 bgcolor=#d6d6d6
| 403728 ||  || — || September 24, 2009 || Mount Lemmon || Mount Lemmon Survey || — || align=right | 3.2 km || 
|-id=729 bgcolor=#E9E9E9
| 403729 ||  || — || January 7, 2003 || Socorro || LINEAR || — || align=right | 1.2 km || 
|-id=730 bgcolor=#E9E9E9
| 403730 ||  || — || October 11, 1977 || Palomar || PLS || — || align=right | 1.2 km || 
|-id=731 bgcolor=#d6d6d6
| 403731 ||  || — || September 13, 2004 || Socorro || LINEAR || EOS || align=right | 2.1 km || 
|-id=732 bgcolor=#E9E9E9
| 403732 ||  || — || October 3, 2005 || Catalina || CSS || — || align=right | 2.2 km || 
|-id=733 bgcolor=#d6d6d6
| 403733 ||  || — || September 18, 2009 || Mount Lemmon || Mount Lemmon Survey || EOS || align=right | 2.1 km || 
|-id=734 bgcolor=#d6d6d6
| 403734 ||  || — || September 16, 2009 || Catalina || CSS || — || align=right | 3.8 km || 
|-id=735 bgcolor=#d6d6d6
| 403735 ||  || — || October 28, 2005 || Mount Lemmon || Mount Lemmon Survey || EMA || align=right | 3.6 km || 
|-id=736 bgcolor=#E9E9E9
| 403736 ||  || — || March 31, 2008 || Mount Lemmon || Mount Lemmon Survey || — || align=right | 2.0 km || 
|-id=737 bgcolor=#d6d6d6
| 403737 ||  || — || December 7, 2005 || Kitt Peak || Spacewatch || — || align=right | 2.8 km || 
|-id=738 bgcolor=#d6d6d6
| 403738 ||  || — || December 26, 2005 || Kitt Peak || Spacewatch || — || align=right | 3.0 km || 
|-id=739 bgcolor=#E9E9E9
| 403739 ||  || — || January 27, 2007 || Mount Lemmon || Mount Lemmon Survey || — || align=right | 1.5 km || 
|-id=740 bgcolor=#E9E9E9
| 403740 ||  || — || August 30, 2005 || Kitt Peak || Spacewatch || — || align=right | 1.7 km || 
|-id=741 bgcolor=#E9E9E9
| 403741 ||  || — || May 30, 2009 || Mount Lemmon || Mount Lemmon Survey || — || align=right | 1.8 km || 
|-id=742 bgcolor=#d6d6d6
| 403742 ||  || — || January 3, 2011 || Catalina || CSS || LIX || align=right | 4.8 km || 
|-id=743 bgcolor=#d6d6d6
| 403743 ||  || — || September 18, 2009 || Catalina || CSS || — || align=right | 2.1 km || 
|-id=744 bgcolor=#d6d6d6
| 403744 ||  || — || December 1, 2005 || Kitt Peak || Spacewatch || — || align=right | 3.8 km || 
|-id=745 bgcolor=#d6d6d6
| 403745 ||  || — || November 7, 2010 || Mount Lemmon || Mount Lemmon Survey || — || align=right | 3.4 km || 
|-id=746 bgcolor=#d6d6d6
| 403746 ||  || — || January 27, 2006 || Mount Lemmon || Mount Lemmon Survey || — || align=right | 2.8 km || 
|-id=747 bgcolor=#d6d6d6
| 403747 ||  || — || May 24, 2001 || Kitt Peak || Spacewatch || — || align=right | 5.1 km || 
|-id=748 bgcolor=#d6d6d6
| 403748 ||  || — || March 4, 2006 || Kitt Peak || Spacewatch || — || align=right | 2.7 km || 
|-id=749 bgcolor=#d6d6d6
| 403749 ||  || — || January 2, 2006 || Catalina || CSS || — || align=right | 3.4 km || 
|-id=750 bgcolor=#d6d6d6
| 403750 ||  || — || January 8, 1994 || Kitt Peak || Spacewatch || — || align=right | 2.3 km || 
|-id=751 bgcolor=#d6d6d6
| 403751 ||  || — || December 11, 2004 || Kitt Peak || Spacewatch || — || align=right | 3.2 km || 
|-id=752 bgcolor=#d6d6d6
| 403752 ||  || — || September 22, 2009 || Catalina || CSS || — || align=right | 3.4 km || 
|-id=753 bgcolor=#d6d6d6
| 403753 ||  || — || January 7, 2006 || Kitt Peak || Spacewatch || EOS || align=right | 1.9 km || 
|-id=754 bgcolor=#d6d6d6
| 403754 ||  || — || November 3, 2004 || Kitt Peak || Spacewatch || — || align=right | 1.9 km || 
|-id=755 bgcolor=#d6d6d6
| 403755 ||  || — || August 29, 2009 || Kitt Peak || Spacewatch || — || align=right | 2.6 km || 
|-id=756 bgcolor=#d6d6d6
| 403756 ||  || — || September 30, 2009 || Mount Lemmon || Mount Lemmon Survey || — || align=right | 2.7 km || 
|-id=757 bgcolor=#d6d6d6
| 403757 ||  || — || November 9, 2009 || Catalina || CSS || 7:4 || align=right | 4.4 km || 
|-id=758 bgcolor=#d6d6d6
| 403758 ||  || — || November 18, 1998 || Kitt Peak || Spacewatch || THM || align=right | 2.5 km || 
|-id=759 bgcolor=#d6d6d6
| 403759 ||  || — || March 2, 2006 || Kitt Peak || Spacewatch || — || align=right | 2.2 km || 
|-id=760 bgcolor=#d6d6d6
| 403760 ||  || — || September 25, 2009 || Kitt Peak || Spacewatch || HYG || align=right | 3.0 km || 
|-id=761 bgcolor=#d6d6d6
| 403761 ||  || — || September 17, 2009 || Catalina || CSS || — || align=right | 3.7 km || 
|-id=762 bgcolor=#d6d6d6
| 403762 ||  || — || October 23, 2009 || Mount Lemmon || Mount Lemmon Survey || — || align=right | 4.0 km || 
|-id=763 bgcolor=#d6d6d6
| 403763 ||  || — || October 18, 2009 || Catalina || CSS || — || align=right | 3.8 km || 
|-id=764 bgcolor=#d6d6d6
| 403764 ||  || — || October 16, 2009 || Catalina || CSS || — || align=right | 3.9 km || 
|-id=765 bgcolor=#d6d6d6
| 403765 ||  || — || September 20, 2008 || Mount Lemmon || Mount Lemmon Survey || — || align=right | 3.4 km || 
|-id=766 bgcolor=#d6d6d6
| 403766 ||  || — || March 5, 2006 || Kitt Peak || Spacewatch || — || align=right | 3.1 km || 
|-id=767 bgcolor=#fefefe
| 403767 ||  || — || April 2, 2006 || Anderson Mesa || LONEOS || H || align=right data-sort-value="0.87" | 870 m || 
|-id=768 bgcolor=#d6d6d6
| 403768 ||  || — || January 15, 2005 || Kitt Peak || Spacewatch || — || align=right | 4.2 km || 
|-id=769 bgcolor=#d6d6d6
| 403769 ||  || — || September 17, 2009 || Catalina || CSS || — || align=right | 2.4 km || 
|-id=770 bgcolor=#d6d6d6
| 403770 ||  || — || November 18, 2009 || Catalina || CSS || — || align=right | 2.7 km || 
|-id=771 bgcolor=#fefefe
| 403771 ||  || — || March 9, 2011 || Socorro || LINEAR || H || align=right data-sort-value="0.89" | 890 m || 
|-id=772 bgcolor=#fefefe
| 403772 ||  || — || February 24, 2006 || Catalina || CSS || H || align=right data-sort-value="0.63" | 630 m || 
|-id=773 bgcolor=#d6d6d6
| 403773 ||  || — || February 24, 2006 || Kitt Peak || Spacewatch || — || align=right | 4.2 km || 
|-id=774 bgcolor=#d6d6d6
| 403774 ||  || — || March 2, 2006 || Kitt Peak || Spacewatch || KOR || align=right | 1.2 km || 
|-id=775 bgcolor=#FFC2E0
| 403775 ||  || — || April 26, 2011 || Mount Lemmon || Mount Lemmon Survey || ATEPHA || align=right data-sort-value="0.24" | 240 m || 
|-id=776 bgcolor=#fefefe
| 403776 ||  || — || September 23, 2008 || Kitt Peak || Spacewatch || — || align=right data-sort-value="0.84" | 840 m || 
|-id=777 bgcolor=#fefefe
| 403777 ||  || — || October 9, 2005 || Kitt Peak || Spacewatch || — || align=right data-sort-value="0.59" | 590 m || 
|-id=778 bgcolor=#fefefe
| 403778 ||  || — || November 10, 2005 || Kitt Peak || Spacewatch || — || align=right data-sort-value="0.62" | 620 m || 
|-id=779 bgcolor=#FA8072
| 403779 ||  || — || October 22, 2005 || Kitt Peak || Spacewatch || — || align=right data-sort-value="0.35" | 350 m || 
|-id=780 bgcolor=#fefefe
| 403780 ||  || — || October 29, 2008 || Kitt Peak || Spacewatch || — || align=right data-sort-value="0.60" | 600 m || 
|-id=781 bgcolor=#fefefe
| 403781 ||  || — || November 22, 2008 || Kitt Peak || Spacewatch || — || align=right data-sort-value="0.62" | 620 m || 
|-id=782 bgcolor=#fefefe
| 403782 ||  || — || February 1, 2003 || Kitt Peak || Spacewatch || — || align=right data-sort-value="0.65" | 650 m || 
|-id=783 bgcolor=#fefefe
| 403783 ||  || — || October 3, 2008 || Mount Lemmon || Mount Lemmon Survey || — || align=right data-sort-value="0.52" | 520 m || 
|-id=784 bgcolor=#E9E9E9
| 403784 ||  || — || September 23, 2011 || Kitt Peak || Spacewatch || — || align=right | 1.6 km || 
|-id=785 bgcolor=#fefefe
| 403785 ||  || — || September 21, 2011 || Kitt Peak || Spacewatch || — || align=right data-sort-value="0.66" | 660 m || 
|-id=786 bgcolor=#fefefe
| 403786 ||  || — || September 12, 2001 || Socorro || LINEAR || — || align=right data-sort-value="0.71" | 710 m || 
|-id=787 bgcolor=#fefefe
| 403787 ||  || — || September 12, 2001 || Socorro || LINEAR || — || align=right data-sort-value="0.63" | 630 m || 
|-id=788 bgcolor=#fefefe
| 403788 ||  || — || September 16, 2001 || Socorro || LINEAR || — || align=right data-sort-value="0.83" | 830 m || 
|-id=789 bgcolor=#fefefe
| 403789 ||  || — || September 11, 2007 || Kitt Peak || Spacewatch || V || align=right data-sort-value="0.65" | 650 m || 
|-id=790 bgcolor=#d6d6d6
| 403790 ||  || — || November 13, 2006 || Kitt Peak || Spacewatch || — || align=right | 2.9 km || 
|-id=791 bgcolor=#fefefe
| 403791 ||  || — || January 7, 2005 || Socorro || LINEAR || ERI || align=right | 1.6 km || 
|-id=792 bgcolor=#fefefe
| 403792 ||  || — || March 3, 2006 || Kitt Peak || Spacewatch || — || align=right data-sort-value="0.96" | 960 m || 
|-id=793 bgcolor=#fefefe
| 403793 ||  || — || October 9, 2004 || Kitt Peak || Spacewatch || — || align=right data-sort-value="0.60" | 600 m || 
|-id=794 bgcolor=#fefefe
| 403794 ||  || — || January 28, 2009 || Kitt Peak || Spacewatch || — || align=right data-sort-value="0.72" | 720 m || 
|-id=795 bgcolor=#E9E9E9
| 403795 ||  || — || June 19, 2010 || Mount Lemmon || Mount Lemmon Survey || — || align=right | 2.5 km || 
|-id=796 bgcolor=#fefefe
| 403796 ||  || — || January 6, 2006 || Kitt Peak || Spacewatch || — || align=right data-sort-value="0.67" | 670 m || 
|-id=797 bgcolor=#fefefe
| 403797 ||  || — || September 27, 2000 || Kitt Peak || Spacewatch || NYS || align=right data-sort-value="0.63" | 630 m || 
|-id=798 bgcolor=#fefefe
| 403798 ||  || — || February 1, 2009 || Kitt Peak || Spacewatch || — || align=right data-sort-value="0.85" | 850 m || 
|-id=799 bgcolor=#fefefe
| 403799 ||  || — || October 17, 2011 || Kitt Peak || Spacewatch || — || align=right data-sort-value="0.88" | 880 m || 
|-id=800 bgcolor=#fefefe
| 403800 ||  || — || December 25, 2005 || Kitt Peak || Spacewatch || — || align=right data-sort-value="0.62" | 620 m || 
|}

403801–403900 

|-bgcolor=#fefefe
| 403801 ||  || — || October 18, 2011 || Kitt Peak || Spacewatch || — || align=right data-sort-value="0.91" | 910 m || 
|-id=802 bgcolor=#fefefe
| 403802 ||  || — || December 10, 2004 || Kitt Peak || Spacewatch || — || align=right data-sort-value="0.66" | 660 m || 
|-id=803 bgcolor=#fefefe
| 403803 ||  || — || October 18, 2011 || Kitt Peak || Spacewatch || — || align=right data-sort-value="0.63" | 630 m || 
|-id=804 bgcolor=#fefefe
| 403804 ||  || — || October 12, 2007 || Mount Lemmon || Mount Lemmon Survey || V || align=right data-sort-value="0.60" | 600 m || 
|-id=805 bgcolor=#fefefe
| 403805 ||  || — || November 19, 1998 || Kitt Peak || Spacewatch || — || align=right data-sort-value="0.70" | 700 m || 
|-id=806 bgcolor=#fefefe
| 403806 ||  || — || October 18, 2011 || Mount Lemmon || Mount Lemmon Survey || — || align=right | 1.0 km || 
|-id=807 bgcolor=#fefefe
| 403807 ||  || — || October 19, 2011 || Kitt Peak || Spacewatch || — || align=right data-sort-value="0.92" | 920 m || 
|-id=808 bgcolor=#fefefe
| 403808 ||  || — || March 10, 2005 || Mount Lemmon || Mount Lemmon Survey || — || align=right data-sort-value="0.68" | 680 m || 
|-id=809 bgcolor=#fefefe
| 403809 ||  || — || December 15, 2004 || Kitt Peak || Spacewatch || — || align=right data-sort-value="0.79" | 790 m || 
|-id=810 bgcolor=#fefefe
| 403810 ||  || — || December 10, 2004 || Socorro || LINEAR || — || align=right | 1.2 km || 
|-id=811 bgcolor=#fefefe
| 403811 ||  || — || September 10, 2007 || Mount Lemmon || Mount Lemmon Survey || — || align=right data-sort-value="0.73" | 730 m || 
|-id=812 bgcolor=#fefefe
| 403812 ||  || — || May 7, 2006 || Mount Lemmon || Mount Lemmon Survey || V || align=right data-sort-value="0.68" | 680 m || 
|-id=813 bgcolor=#fefefe
| 403813 ||  || — || July 19, 2004 || Anderson Mesa || LONEOS || — || align=right data-sort-value="0.79" | 790 m || 
|-id=814 bgcolor=#fefefe
| 403814 ||  || — || November 24, 2008 || Mount Lemmon || Mount Lemmon Survey || — || align=right data-sort-value="0.56" | 560 m || 
|-id=815 bgcolor=#fefefe
| 403815 ||  || — || April 5, 2000 || Socorro || LINEAR || — || align=right | 1.8 km || 
|-id=816 bgcolor=#fefefe
| 403816 ||  || — || December 28, 2005 || Mount Lemmon || Mount Lemmon Survey || — || align=right data-sort-value="0.61" | 610 m || 
|-id=817 bgcolor=#fefefe
| 403817 ||  || — || November 8, 2008 || Mount Lemmon || Mount Lemmon Survey || — || align=right | 1.1 km || 
|-id=818 bgcolor=#fefefe
| 403818 ||  || — || October 24, 2011 || Catalina || CSS || — || align=right | 1.0 km || 
|-id=819 bgcolor=#d6d6d6
| 403819 ||  || — || February 29, 2008 || Mount Lemmon || Mount Lemmon Survey || — || align=right | 3.1 km || 
|-id=820 bgcolor=#fefefe
| 403820 ||  || — || September 15, 2004 || Kitt Peak || Spacewatch || V || align=right data-sort-value="0.56" | 560 m || 
|-id=821 bgcolor=#fefefe
| 403821 ||  || — || September 12, 2007 || Catalina || CSS || — || align=right | 1.0 km || 
|-id=822 bgcolor=#fefefe
| 403822 ||  || — || October 8, 2004 || Kitt Peak || Spacewatch || — || align=right data-sort-value="0.71" | 710 m || 
|-id=823 bgcolor=#fefefe
| 403823 ||  || — || October 7, 2004 || Anderson Mesa || LONEOS || — || align=right data-sort-value="0.65" | 650 m || 
|-id=824 bgcolor=#fefefe
| 403824 ||  || — || January 7, 2006 || Kitt Peak || Spacewatch || — || align=right data-sort-value="0.69" | 690 m || 
|-id=825 bgcolor=#fefefe
| 403825 ||  || — || December 12, 2004 || Kitt Peak || Spacewatch || V || align=right data-sort-value="0.82" | 820 m || 
|-id=826 bgcolor=#fefefe
| 403826 ||  || — || January 8, 2005 || Campo Imperatore || CINEOS || — || align=right | 1.1 km || 
|-id=827 bgcolor=#fefefe
| 403827 ||  || — || October 14, 2001 || Socorro || LINEAR || — || align=right data-sort-value="0.69" | 690 m || 
|-id=828 bgcolor=#fefefe
| 403828 ||  || — || December 30, 2008 || Mount Lemmon || Mount Lemmon Survey || — || align=right data-sort-value="0.66" | 660 m || 
|-id=829 bgcolor=#E9E9E9
| 403829 ||  || — || November 4, 2007 || Kitt Peak || Spacewatch || — || align=right | 1.1 km || 
|-id=830 bgcolor=#fefefe
| 403830 ||  || — || October 31, 2008 || Mount Lemmon || Mount Lemmon Survey || V || align=right data-sort-value="0.76" | 760 m || 
|-id=831 bgcolor=#E9E9E9
| 403831 ||  || — || October 19, 2011 || Mount Lemmon || Mount Lemmon Survey || — || align=right data-sort-value="0.82" | 820 m || 
|-id=832 bgcolor=#fefefe
| 403832 ||  || — || September 14, 2007 || Socorro || LINEAR || NYS || align=right data-sort-value="0.65" | 650 m || 
|-id=833 bgcolor=#fefefe
| 403833 ||  || — || September 10, 2004 || Kitt Peak || Spacewatch || — || align=right data-sort-value="0.69" | 690 m || 
|-id=834 bgcolor=#fefefe
| 403834 ||  || — || January 19, 2005 || Kitt Peak || Spacewatch || NYS || align=right data-sort-value="0.63" | 630 m || 
|-id=835 bgcolor=#fefefe
| 403835 ||  || — || April 14, 2010 || Kitt Peak || Spacewatch || — || align=right data-sort-value="0.64" | 640 m || 
|-id=836 bgcolor=#fefefe
| 403836 ||  || — || December 19, 2004 || Mount Lemmon || Mount Lemmon Survey || — || align=right data-sort-value="0.79" | 790 m || 
|-id=837 bgcolor=#fefefe
| 403837 ||  || — || May 19, 2010 || Mount Lemmon || Mount Lemmon Survey || — || align=right data-sort-value="0.77" | 770 m || 
|-id=838 bgcolor=#fefefe
| 403838 ||  || — || January 26, 2006 || Kitt Peak || Spacewatch || — || align=right data-sort-value="0.71" | 710 m || 
|-id=839 bgcolor=#E9E9E9
| 403839 ||  || — || March 22, 2009 || Mount Lemmon || Mount Lemmon Survey || — || align=right | 1.9 km || 
|-id=840 bgcolor=#fefefe
| 403840 ||  || — || March 18, 2009 || Catalina || CSS || — || align=right data-sort-value="0.85" | 850 m || 
|-id=841 bgcolor=#fefefe
| 403841 ||  || — || September 14, 2007 || Kitt Peak || Spacewatch || — || align=right data-sort-value="0.75" | 750 m || 
|-id=842 bgcolor=#fefefe
| 403842 ||  || — || January 31, 2009 || Mount Lemmon || Mount Lemmon Survey || V || align=right data-sort-value="0.60" | 600 m || 
|-id=843 bgcolor=#fefefe
| 403843 ||  || — || July 24, 2000 || Kitt Peak || Spacewatch || — || align=right data-sort-value="0.67" | 670 m || 
|-id=844 bgcolor=#fefefe
| 403844 ||  || — || April 10, 2010 || Kitt Peak || Spacewatch || — || align=right data-sort-value="0.82" | 820 m || 
|-id=845 bgcolor=#fefefe
| 403845 ||  || — || May 11, 2007 || Mount Lemmon || Mount Lemmon Survey || — || align=right data-sort-value="0.79" | 790 m || 
|-id=846 bgcolor=#fefefe
| 403846 ||  || — || September 11, 2004 || Kitt Peak || Spacewatch || — || align=right data-sort-value="0.58" | 580 m || 
|-id=847 bgcolor=#fefefe
| 403847 ||  || — || October 29, 2011 || Kitt Peak || Spacewatch || — || align=right | 1.00 km || 
|-id=848 bgcolor=#fefefe
| 403848 ||  || — || February 21, 2009 || Kitt Peak || Spacewatch || — || align=right data-sort-value="0.85" | 850 m || 
|-id=849 bgcolor=#fefefe
| 403849 ||  || — || January 1, 2009 || Mount Lemmon || Mount Lemmon Survey || — || align=right data-sort-value="0.78" | 780 m || 
|-id=850 bgcolor=#fefefe
| 403850 ||  || — || October 6, 1996 || Kitt Peak || Spacewatch || — || align=right data-sort-value="0.85" | 850 m || 
|-id=851 bgcolor=#fefefe
| 403851 ||  || — || March 18, 2010 || Kitt Peak || Spacewatch || — || align=right data-sort-value="0.70" | 700 m || 
|-id=852 bgcolor=#fefefe
| 403852 ||  || — || December 10, 2004 || Kitt Peak || Spacewatch || — || align=right data-sort-value="0.69" | 690 m || 
|-id=853 bgcolor=#E9E9E9
| 403853 ||  || — || September 18, 2006 || Catalina || CSS || AGN || align=right | 1.5 km || 
|-id=854 bgcolor=#fefefe
| 403854 ||  || — || September 21, 2007 || Kitt Peak || Spacewatch || — || align=right data-sort-value="0.87" | 870 m || 
|-id=855 bgcolor=#fefefe
| 403855 ||  || — || September 14, 2007 || Kitt Peak || Spacewatch || MAS || align=right data-sort-value="0.71" | 710 m || 
|-id=856 bgcolor=#fefefe
| 403856 ||  || — || January 19, 2005 || Kitt Peak || Spacewatch || NYS || align=right data-sort-value="0.59" | 590 m || 
|-id=857 bgcolor=#fefefe
| 403857 ||  || — || August 27, 2001 || Kitt Peak || Spacewatch || — || align=right data-sort-value="0.56" | 560 m || 
|-id=858 bgcolor=#E9E9E9
| 403858 ||  || — || April 14, 2005 || Kitt Peak || Spacewatch || WIT || align=right data-sort-value="0.99" | 990 m || 
|-id=859 bgcolor=#fefefe
| 403859 ||  || — || May 7, 2006 || Mount Lemmon || Mount Lemmon Survey || V || align=right data-sort-value="0.68" | 680 m || 
|-id=860 bgcolor=#E9E9E9
| 403860 ||  || — || February 18, 2004 || Kitt Peak || Spacewatch || — || align=right | 1.4 km || 
|-id=861 bgcolor=#E9E9E9
| 403861 ||  || — || December 27, 2003 || Socorro || LINEAR || — || align=right | 1.3 km || 
|-id=862 bgcolor=#fefefe
| 403862 ||  || — || December 31, 2008 || Kitt Peak || Spacewatch || — || align=right data-sort-value="0.74" | 740 m || 
|-id=863 bgcolor=#fefefe
| 403863 ||  || — || December 9, 2004 || Kitt Peak || Spacewatch || — || align=right | 1.0 km || 
|-id=864 bgcolor=#fefefe
| 403864 ||  || — || October 15, 2007 || Mount Lemmon || Mount Lemmon Survey || — || align=right data-sort-value="0.87" | 870 m || 
|-id=865 bgcolor=#E9E9E9
| 403865 ||  || — || October 20, 2011 || Mount Lemmon || Mount Lemmon Survey || — || align=right | 2.0 km || 
|-id=866 bgcolor=#fefefe
| 403866 ||  || — || September 23, 2011 || Kitt Peak || Spacewatch || — || align=right data-sort-value="0.89" | 890 m || 
|-id=867 bgcolor=#fefefe
| 403867 ||  || — || February 7, 2002 || Kitt Peak || Spacewatch || — || align=right data-sort-value="0.66" | 660 m || 
|-id=868 bgcolor=#fefefe
| 403868 ||  || — || October 16, 2007 || Catalina || CSS || — || align=right data-sort-value="0.97" | 970 m || 
|-id=869 bgcolor=#fefefe
| 403869 ||  || — || November 11, 1996 || Kitt Peak || Spacewatch || MAS || align=right data-sort-value="0.61" | 610 m || 
|-id=870 bgcolor=#fefefe
| 403870 ||  || — || September 4, 2007 || Mount Lemmon || Mount Lemmon Survey || — || align=right data-sort-value="0.82" | 820 m || 
|-id=871 bgcolor=#E9E9E9
| 403871 ||  || — || September 18, 2006 || Kitt Peak || Spacewatch || — || align=right | 1.8 km || 
|-id=872 bgcolor=#E9E9E9
| 403872 ||  || — || October 30, 2011 || Mount Lemmon || Mount Lemmon Survey || — || align=right | 1.5 km || 
|-id=873 bgcolor=#fefefe
| 403873 ||  || — || March 9, 2005 || Mount Lemmon || Mount Lemmon Survey || MAS || align=right data-sort-value="0.70" | 700 m || 
|-id=874 bgcolor=#E9E9E9
| 403874 ||  || — || November 18, 1998 || Kitt Peak || Spacewatch || — || align=right | 1.7 km || 
|-id=875 bgcolor=#E9E9E9
| 403875 ||  || — || October 23, 2011 || Kitt Peak || Spacewatch || — || align=right | 1.6 km || 
|-id=876 bgcolor=#fefefe
| 403876 ||  || — || September 28, 2000 || Kitt Peak || Spacewatch || — || align=right data-sort-value="0.70" | 700 m || 
|-id=877 bgcolor=#E9E9E9
| 403877 ||  || — || December 19, 2003 || Socorro || LINEAR || — || align=right | 1.0 km || 
|-id=878 bgcolor=#fefefe
| 403878 ||  || — || April 26, 2006 || Kitt Peak || Spacewatch || (2076) || align=right data-sort-value="0.90" | 900 m || 
|-id=879 bgcolor=#fefefe
| 403879 ||  || — || May 24, 2006 || Kitt Peak || Spacewatch || — || align=right data-sort-value="0.91" | 910 m || 
|-id=880 bgcolor=#fefefe
| 403880 ||  || — || November 3, 2004 || Kitt Peak || Spacewatch || — || align=right data-sort-value="0.82" | 820 m || 
|-id=881 bgcolor=#fefefe
| 403881 ||  || — || September 12, 2007 || Mount Lemmon || Mount Lemmon Survey || — || align=right data-sort-value="0.60" | 600 m || 
|-id=882 bgcolor=#fefefe
| 403882 ||  || — || October 12, 2007 || Mount Lemmon || Mount Lemmon Survey || — || align=right data-sort-value="0.96" | 960 m || 
|-id=883 bgcolor=#fefefe
| 403883 ||  || — || January 31, 2006 || Kitt Peak || Spacewatch || — || align=right | 2.0 km || 
|-id=884 bgcolor=#d6d6d6
| 403884 ||  || — || February 6, 2002 || Socorro || LINEAR || — || align=right | 3.4 km || 
|-id=885 bgcolor=#fefefe
| 403885 ||  || — || September 13, 2007 || Mount Lemmon || Mount Lemmon Survey || — || align=right data-sort-value="0.63" | 630 m || 
|-id=886 bgcolor=#fefefe
| 403886 ||  || — || February 1, 2009 || Kitt Peak || Spacewatch || — || align=right data-sort-value="0.90" | 900 m || 
|-id=887 bgcolor=#E9E9E9
| 403887 ||  || — || September 5, 1994 || Kitt Peak || Spacewatch || — || align=right | 1.1 km || 
|-id=888 bgcolor=#fefefe
| 403888 ||  || — || October 13, 2007 || Catalina || CSS || MAS || align=right data-sort-value="0.66" | 660 m || 
|-id=889 bgcolor=#fefefe
| 403889 ||  || — || December 14, 2004 || Campo Imperatore || CINEOS || — || align=right data-sort-value="0.77" | 770 m || 
|-id=890 bgcolor=#fefefe
| 403890 ||  || — || April 8, 2006 || Kitt Peak || Spacewatch || — || align=right data-sort-value="0.77" | 770 m || 
|-id=891 bgcolor=#fefefe
| 403891 ||  || — || December 16, 2004 || Kitt Peak || Spacewatch || — || align=right data-sort-value="0.79" | 790 m || 
|-id=892 bgcolor=#fefefe
| 403892 ||  || — || May 6, 2010 || Mount Lemmon || Mount Lemmon Survey || — || align=right data-sort-value="0.72" | 720 m || 
|-id=893 bgcolor=#E9E9E9
| 403893 ||  || — || September 1, 1998 || Kitt Peak || Spacewatch || — || align=right | 1.1 km || 
|-id=894 bgcolor=#fefefe
| 403894 ||  || — || January 12, 2002 || Kitt Peak || Spacewatch || — || align=right data-sort-value="0.75" | 750 m || 
|-id=895 bgcolor=#E9E9E9
| 403895 ||  || — || December 28, 2003 || Kitt Peak || Spacewatch || — || align=right data-sort-value="0.88" | 880 m || 
|-id=896 bgcolor=#d6d6d6
| 403896 ||  || — || September 30, 2011 || Mount Lemmon || Mount Lemmon Survey || — || align=right | 2.5 km || 
|-id=897 bgcolor=#d6d6d6
| 403897 ||  || — || May 27, 2003 || Kitt Peak || Spacewatch || — || align=right | 3.6 km || 
|-id=898 bgcolor=#E9E9E9
| 403898 ||  || — || January 1, 2008 || Catalina || CSS || HNS || align=right | 1.7 km || 
|-id=899 bgcolor=#E9E9E9
| 403899 ||  || — || November 19, 2006 || Catalina || CSS ||  || align=right | 2.9 km || 
|-id=900 bgcolor=#E9E9E9
| 403900 ||  || — || September 30, 2006 || Mount Lemmon || Mount Lemmon Survey || — || align=right | 1.3 km || 
|}

403901–404000 

|-bgcolor=#d6d6d6
| 403901 ||  || — || November 23, 2006 || Mount Lemmon || Mount Lemmon Survey || — || align=right | 2.6 km || 
|-id=902 bgcolor=#E9E9E9
| 403902 ||  || — || November 22, 2011 || Mount Lemmon || Mount Lemmon Survey || — || align=right | 1.3 km || 
|-id=903 bgcolor=#d6d6d6
| 403903 ||  || — || December 25, 2011 || Kitt Peak || Spacewatch || — || align=right | 3.4 km || 
|-id=904 bgcolor=#d6d6d6
| 403904 ||  || — || February 22, 2007 || Catalina || CSS || — || align=right | 3.3 km || 
|-id=905 bgcolor=#d6d6d6
| 403905 ||  || — || February 15, 2007 || Catalina || CSS || — || align=right | 3.5 km || 
|-id=906 bgcolor=#E9E9E9
| 403906 ||  || — || January 13, 2008 || Kitt Peak || Spacewatch || (5) || align=right data-sort-value="0.83" | 830 m || 
|-id=907 bgcolor=#fefefe
| 403907 ||  || — || August 18, 2007 || Anderson Mesa || LONEOS || — || align=right data-sort-value="0.68" | 680 m || 
|-id=908 bgcolor=#fefefe
| 403908 ||  || — || September 20, 1996 || Kitt Peak || Spacewatch || NYS || align=right data-sort-value="0.54" | 540 m || 
|-id=909 bgcolor=#E9E9E9
| 403909 ||  || — || September 12, 1994 || Kitt Peak || Spacewatch || (5) || align=right data-sort-value="0.69" | 690 m || 
|-id=910 bgcolor=#d6d6d6
| 403910 ||  || — || December 1, 1996 || Kitt Peak || Spacewatch || — || align=right | 2.6 km || 
|-id=911 bgcolor=#E9E9E9
| 403911 ||  || — || April 2, 2009 || Kitt Peak || Spacewatch || — || align=right | 1.0 km || 
|-id=912 bgcolor=#fefefe
| 403912 ||  || — || October 12, 2007 || Mount Lemmon || Mount Lemmon Survey || NYS || align=right data-sort-value="0.78" | 780 m || 
|-id=913 bgcolor=#C2FFFF
| 403913 ||  || — || December 29, 2011 || Kitt Peak || Spacewatch || L4 || align=right | 7.9 km || 
|-id=914 bgcolor=#d6d6d6
| 403914 ||  || — || December 29, 2011 || Kitt Peak || Spacewatch || — || align=right | 2.5 km || 
|-id=915 bgcolor=#E9E9E9
| 403915 ||  || — || March 6, 2008 || Catalina || CSS || — || align=right | 2.9 km || 
|-id=916 bgcolor=#E9E9E9
| 403916 ||  || — || October 30, 2010 || Mount Lemmon || Mount Lemmon Survey || — || align=right | 2.5 km || 
|-id=917 bgcolor=#fefefe
| 403917 ||  || — || February 11, 2008 || Mount Lemmon || Mount Lemmon Survey || — || align=right | 1.2 km || 
|-id=918 bgcolor=#E9E9E9
| 403918 ||  || — || October 4, 2006 || Mount Lemmon || Mount Lemmon Survey || — || align=right | 1.4 km || 
|-id=919 bgcolor=#d6d6d6
| 403919 ||  || — || November 18, 2006 || Mount Lemmon || Mount Lemmon Survey || — || align=right | 3.3 km || 
|-id=920 bgcolor=#d6d6d6
| 403920 ||  || — || December 31, 2011 || Catalina || CSS || — || align=right | 3.8 km || 
|-id=921 bgcolor=#E9E9E9
| 403921 ||  || — || September 16, 2006 || Catalina || CSS || (1547) || align=right | 2.0 km || 
|-id=922 bgcolor=#fefefe
| 403922 ||  || — || December 25, 2011 || Kitt Peak || Spacewatch || NYS || align=right data-sort-value="0.71" | 710 m || 
|-id=923 bgcolor=#E9E9E9
| 403923 ||  || — || January 10, 2008 || Kitt Peak || Spacewatch || EUN || align=right | 1.3 km || 
|-id=924 bgcolor=#fefefe
| 403924 ||  || — || November 11, 2007 || XuYi || PMO NEO || — || align=right | 1.2 km || 
|-id=925 bgcolor=#d6d6d6
| 403925 ||  || — || July 27, 2009 || Kitt Peak || Spacewatch || EOS || align=right | 2.2 km || 
|-id=926 bgcolor=#d6d6d6
| 403926 ||  || — || February 20, 2007 || Siding Spring || SSS || — || align=right | 4.1 km || 
|-id=927 bgcolor=#fefefe
| 403927 ||  || — || December 1, 2003 || Kitt Peak || Spacewatch || — || align=right data-sort-value="0.88" | 880 m || 
|-id=928 bgcolor=#E9E9E9
| 403928 ||  || — || December 26, 2011 || Kitt Peak || Spacewatch || — || align=right | 3.0 km || 
|-id=929 bgcolor=#fefefe
| 403929 ||  || — || December 18, 2004 || Mount Lemmon || Mount Lemmon Survey || — || align=right data-sort-value="0.74" | 740 m || 
|-id=930 bgcolor=#E9E9E9
| 403930 ||  || — || October 20, 2006 || Catalina || CSS || — || align=right | 1.6 km || 
|-id=931 bgcolor=#E9E9E9
| 403931 ||  || — || April 13, 2008 || Mount Lemmon || Mount Lemmon Survey || AGN || align=right | 1.2 km || 
|-id=932 bgcolor=#fefefe
| 403932 ||  || — || December 4, 2007 || Catalina || CSS || — || align=right data-sort-value="0.98" | 980 m || 
|-id=933 bgcolor=#fefefe
| 403933 ||  || — || July 5, 2010 || Kitt Peak || Spacewatch || — || align=right | 1.2 km || 
|-id=934 bgcolor=#E9E9E9
| 403934 ||  || — || September 11, 2010 || Mount Lemmon || Mount Lemmon Survey || — || align=right | 2.1 km || 
|-id=935 bgcolor=#d6d6d6
| 403935 ||  || — || March 15, 2007 || Mount Lemmon || Mount Lemmon Survey || — || align=right | 2.7 km || 
|-id=936 bgcolor=#d6d6d6
| 403936 ||  || — || November 22, 2005 || Kitt Peak || Spacewatch || — || align=right | 2.6 km || 
|-id=937 bgcolor=#E9E9E9
| 403937 ||  || — || June 5, 2005 || Kitt Peak || Spacewatch || — || align=right | 2.0 km || 
|-id=938 bgcolor=#d6d6d6
| 403938 ||  || — || December 6, 2005 || Kitt Peak || Spacewatch || — || align=right | 3.8 km || 
|-id=939 bgcolor=#E9E9E9
| 403939 ||  || — || September 21, 2001 || Anderson Mesa || LONEOS || — || align=right | 3.3 km || 
|-id=940 bgcolor=#d6d6d6
| 403940 ||  || — || November 28, 2011 || Mount Lemmon || Mount Lemmon Survey || — || align=right | 4.5 km || 
|-id=941 bgcolor=#E9E9E9
| 403941 ||  || — || February 29, 2008 || Mount Lemmon || Mount Lemmon Survey || HOF || align=right | 2.5 km || 
|-id=942 bgcolor=#d6d6d6
| 403942 ||  || — || January 19, 2012 || Kitt Peak || Spacewatch || EOS || align=right | 2.4 km || 
|-id=943 bgcolor=#E9E9E9
| 403943 ||  || — || May 16, 1999 || Kitt Peak || Spacewatch || — || align=right | 3.1 km || 
|-id=944 bgcolor=#d6d6d6
| 403944 ||  || — || May 23, 2003 || Kitt Peak || Spacewatch || — || align=right | 3.0 km || 
|-id=945 bgcolor=#E9E9E9
| 403945 ||  || — || June 28, 2010 || WISE || WISE || — || align=right | 3.0 km || 
|-id=946 bgcolor=#E9E9E9
| 403946 ||  || — || August 31, 2005 || Kitt Peak || Spacewatch || — || align=right | 2.2 km || 
|-id=947 bgcolor=#E9E9E9
| 403947 ||  || — || November 2, 2006 || Mount Lemmon || Mount Lemmon Survey || — || align=right | 2.8 km || 
|-id=948 bgcolor=#E9E9E9
| 403948 ||  || — || November 18, 2006 || Kitt Peak || Spacewatch || — || align=right | 2.4 km || 
|-id=949 bgcolor=#E9E9E9
| 403949 ||  || — || September 16, 2010 || Kitt Peak || Spacewatch || AST || align=right | 1.5 km || 
|-id=950 bgcolor=#d6d6d6
| 403950 ||  || — || February 12, 2002 || Kitt Peak || Spacewatch || — || align=right | 2.6 km || 
|-id=951 bgcolor=#E9E9E9
| 403951 ||  || — || September 25, 2006 || Mount Lemmon || Mount Lemmon Survey || — || align=right | 1.3 km || 
|-id=952 bgcolor=#fefefe
| 403952 ||  || — || November 19, 2003 || Kitt Peak || Spacewatch || — || align=right data-sort-value="0.86" | 860 m || 
|-id=953 bgcolor=#d6d6d6
| 403953 ||  || — || December 21, 2005 || Catalina || CSS || — || align=right | 4.7 km || 
|-id=954 bgcolor=#E9E9E9
| 403954 ||  || — || June 30, 2005 || Kitt Peak || Spacewatch || — || align=right | 1.8 km || 
|-id=955 bgcolor=#d6d6d6
| 403955 ||  || — || December 29, 2011 || Kitt Peak || Spacewatch || HYG || align=right | 2.5 km || 
|-id=956 bgcolor=#E9E9E9
| 403956 ||  || — || September 16, 2010 || Mount Lemmon || Mount Lemmon Survey || — || align=right | 1.5 km || 
|-id=957 bgcolor=#E9E9E9
| 403957 ||  || — || December 1, 2006 || Mount Lemmon || Mount Lemmon Survey || PAD || align=right | 1.8 km || 
|-id=958 bgcolor=#d6d6d6
| 403958 ||  || — || December 24, 2006 || Mount Lemmon || Mount Lemmon Survey || TEL || align=right | 1.9 km || 
|-id=959 bgcolor=#d6d6d6
| 403959 ||  || — || January 21, 2012 || Kitt Peak || Spacewatch || EOS || align=right | 1.9 km || 
|-id=960 bgcolor=#d6d6d6
| 403960 ||  || — || September 18, 2009 || Mount Lemmon || Mount Lemmon Survey || — || align=right | 3.2 km || 
|-id=961 bgcolor=#E9E9E9
| 403961 ||  || — || April 1, 2008 || Mount Lemmon || Mount Lemmon Survey || — || align=right | 2.3 km || 
|-id=962 bgcolor=#E9E9E9
| 403962 ||  || — || March 26, 2008 || Mount Lemmon || Mount Lemmon Survey || — || align=right | 1.4 km || 
|-id=963 bgcolor=#E9E9E9
| 403963 ||  || — || October 7, 2010 || Catalina || CSS || — || align=right | 3.1 km || 
|-id=964 bgcolor=#E9E9E9
| 403964 ||  || — || September 12, 2005 || Kitt Peak || Spacewatch || — || align=right | 1.9 km || 
|-id=965 bgcolor=#E9E9E9
| 403965 ||  || — || February 7, 2008 || Mount Lemmon || Mount Lemmon Survey || — || align=right data-sort-value="0.81" | 810 m || 
|-id=966 bgcolor=#d6d6d6
| 403966 ||  || — || February 17, 2007 || Kitt Peak || Spacewatch || — || align=right | 3.7 km || 
|-id=967 bgcolor=#d6d6d6
| 403967 ||  || — || December 27, 2011 || Mount Lemmon || Mount Lemmon Survey || — || align=right | 2.6 km || 
|-id=968 bgcolor=#d6d6d6
| 403968 ||  || — || March 12, 2008 || Kitt Peak || Spacewatch || — || align=right | 2.5 km || 
|-id=969 bgcolor=#d6d6d6
| 403969 ||  || — || March 11, 2007 || Catalina || CSS || — || align=right | 4.4 km || 
|-id=970 bgcolor=#E9E9E9
| 403970 ||  || — || March 7, 2008 || Kitt Peak || Spacewatch || — || align=right | 2.6 km || 
|-id=971 bgcolor=#E9E9E9
| 403971 ||  || — || October 16, 2006 || Kitt Peak || Spacewatch || — || align=right | 1.3 km || 
|-id=972 bgcolor=#fefefe
| 403972 ||  || — || September 12, 2007 || Catalina || CSS || — || align=right data-sort-value="0.78" | 780 m || 
|-id=973 bgcolor=#d6d6d6
| 403973 ||  || — || October 13, 2010 || Kitt Peak || Spacewatch || — || align=right | 1.8 km || 
|-id=974 bgcolor=#E9E9E9
| 403974 ||  || — || February 8, 2008 || Catalina || CSS || — || align=right | 1.1 km || 
|-id=975 bgcolor=#d6d6d6
| 403975 ||  || — || November 28, 2006 || Kitt Peak || Spacewatch || — || align=right | 3.0 km || 
|-id=976 bgcolor=#d6d6d6
| 403976 ||  || — || November 5, 2005 || Kitt Peak || Spacewatch || — || align=right | 2.0 km || 
|-id=977 bgcolor=#fefefe
| 403977 ||  || — || December 14, 2007 || Mount Lemmon || Mount Lemmon Survey || NYS || align=right data-sort-value="0.87" | 870 m || 
|-id=978 bgcolor=#E9E9E9
| 403978 ||  || — || February 9, 2008 || Kitt Peak || Spacewatch || — || align=right | 1.4 km || 
|-id=979 bgcolor=#d6d6d6
| 403979 ||  || — || December 27, 1999 || Kitt Peak || Spacewatch || — || align=right | 3.8 km || 
|-id=980 bgcolor=#d6d6d6
| 403980 ||  || — || December 27, 2005 || Mount Lemmon || Mount Lemmon Survey || — || align=right | 3.0 km || 
|-id=981 bgcolor=#E9E9E9
| 403981 ||  || — || February 9, 2008 || Kitt Peak || Spacewatch || EUN || align=right | 1.1 km || 
|-id=982 bgcolor=#d6d6d6
| 403982 ||  || — || May 4, 2008 || Kitt Peak || Spacewatch || — || align=right | 5.2 km || 
|-id=983 bgcolor=#d6d6d6
| 403983 ||  || — || December 29, 2005 || Kitt Peak || Spacewatch || — || align=right | 4.1 km || 
|-id=984 bgcolor=#d6d6d6
| 403984 ||  || — || December 28, 2011 || Kitt Peak || Spacewatch || URS || align=right | 3.8 km || 
|-id=985 bgcolor=#d6d6d6
| 403985 ||  || — || February 23, 2007 || Mount Lemmon || Mount Lemmon Survey || — || align=right | 2.3 km || 
|-id=986 bgcolor=#d6d6d6
| 403986 ||  || — || April 28, 2008 || Kitt Peak || Spacewatch || — || align=right | 3.7 km || 
|-id=987 bgcolor=#E9E9E9
| 403987 ||  || — || October 31, 2010 || Mount Lemmon || Mount Lemmon Survey || — || align=right | 2.3 km || 
|-id=988 bgcolor=#d6d6d6
| 403988 ||  || — || October 12, 2010 || Mount Lemmon || Mount Lemmon Survey || — || align=right | 2.8 km || 
|-id=989 bgcolor=#E9E9E9
| 403989 ||  || — || January 27, 2012 || Mount Lemmon || Mount Lemmon Survey || — || align=right | 2.7 km || 
|-id=990 bgcolor=#E9E9E9
| 403990 ||  || — || August 28, 2005 || Kitt Peak || Spacewatch || — || align=right | 2.1 km || 
|-id=991 bgcolor=#d6d6d6
| 403991 ||  || — || March 9, 2007 || Kitt Peak || Spacewatch || — || align=right | 2.4 km || 
|-id=992 bgcolor=#E9E9E9
| 403992 ||  || — || February 28, 2008 || Kitt Peak || Spacewatch || — || align=right | 3.1 km || 
|-id=993 bgcolor=#E9E9E9
| 403993 ||  || — || February 2, 2008 || Mount Lemmon || Mount Lemmon Survey || — || align=right | 1.2 km || 
|-id=994 bgcolor=#E9E9E9
| 403994 ||  || — || March 2, 2008 || Mount Lemmon || Mount Lemmon Survey || — || align=right | 2.2 km || 
|-id=995 bgcolor=#d6d6d6
| 403995 ||  || — || December 2, 2010 || Mount Lemmon || Mount Lemmon Survey || — || align=right | 4.1 km || 
|-id=996 bgcolor=#d6d6d6
| 403996 ||  || — || November 2, 2011 || Mount Lemmon || Mount Lemmon Survey || — || align=right | 3.9 km || 
|-id=997 bgcolor=#d6d6d6
| 403997 ||  || — || July 30, 2010 || WISE || WISE || URS || align=right | 5.2 km || 
|-id=998 bgcolor=#E9E9E9
| 403998 ||  || — || June 28, 2010 || WISE || WISE || DOR || align=right | 3.9 km || 
|-id=999 bgcolor=#d6d6d6
| 403999 ||  || — || December 30, 2000 || Kitt Peak || Spacewatch || — || align=right | 3.2 km || 
|-id=000 bgcolor=#d6d6d6
| 404000 ||  || — || September 29, 2005 || Kitt Peak || Spacewatch || KOR || align=right | 1.3 km || 
|}

References

External links 
 Discovery Circumstances: Numbered Minor Planets (400001)–(405000) (IAU Minor Planet Center)

0403